= List of shipwrecks in December 1887 =

The list of shipwrecks in December 1887 includes ships sunk, foundered, grounded, or otherwise lost during December 1887.

== 1 December ==
List of shipwrecks: 1 December 1887
Ship	State	Description
Atahualpa	United Kingdom	The ship was sighted whilst on a voyage from Coquimbo, Chile to Liverpool, Lancashire. No further trace, reported missing.
Frank Wilson	Germany	The ship departed from Pernambuco, Brazil for Falmouth, Cornwall, United Kingdom. No further trace, reported missing.

== 2 December ==
List of shipwrecks: 2 December 1887
Ship	State	Description
Beatrice	United Kingdom	The trow sank at Bristol, Gloucestershire.
Catherine	United Kingdom	The barque collided with the steamship Clyde (United Kingdom) and sank in the English Channel off Dover, Kent. Her crew were rescued by Clyde.
Cecilia Rio Grandense	Spain	The brig was wrecked at Ambergris Cay, north of the Abaco Islands, Bahamas. Her crew were rescued. She was on a voyage from Cárdenas, Cuba to Barcelona, Spain with sugar and rum.
Charles	United Kingdom	The barque ran aground on the Boulder Bank, in the English Channel off Rye, Sussex. She floated off and sank. Her crew were rescued by a fishing smack.
Judith	Portugal	The brig capsized in the Atlantic Ocean (35°00′N 13°50′W). Her crew of nine were rescued by the barque Strauss (Norway) and landed at Falmouth, Cornwall. Judith was on a voyage from Pará, Brazil to São Miguel Island, Azores.
Sophia	United Kingdom	The smack was wrecked in Loch Eribol.

== 3 December ==
List of shipwrecks: 3 December 1887
Ship	State	Description
Seaton	United Kingdom	The steamship collided with the steamship Argo (United Kingdom) and sank in the North Sea with the loss of two of her crew.

== 4 December ==
List of shipwrecks: 4 December 1887
Ship	State	Description
Lorne	United Kingdom	The steamship was wrecked on the east coast of Hainan, China with the loss of four lives from about 70 people on board. Two people were reported missing. She was on a voyage from Saigon, French Indo-China to Hong Kong.

== 6 December ==
List of shipwrecks: 6 December 1887
Ship	State	Description
Donegal	United Kingdom	The ship departed from Savannah, Georgia, United States for Trieste. No further trace, reported missing.
Kalmia	Flag unknown	The ship departed from Porto, Portugal for the Newfoundland Colony. No further trace, reported overdue.
Ludwig	Germany	The ship departed from Savannah for Liverpool, Lancashire, United Kingdom. No further trace, reported missing.
Mary Jane	United Kingdom	The Mersey Flat sank at Liverpool.

== 7 December ==
List of shipwrecks: 7 December 1887
Ship	State	Description
Ethel	United Kingdom	The steamship was driven ashore on Sheep Island, Argyllshire. She was refloated on 12 December and towed in to Greenock, Renfrewshire.
San Vincente	United States	The steamship caught fire and sank off Pigeon Point, 45 nautical miles (83 km) south of San Francisco, California. Eleven crew, who abandoned ship in a lifeboat, drowned. Her captain and second mate were taken off by a boat from Queen of the Pacific (United States).

== 9 December ==
List of shipwrecks: 9 December 1887
Ship	State	Description
Unnamed	United Kingdom	A fishing smack was driven ashore and severely damaged at Roveyhead, Shetland Islands. Her crew survived.
Unnamed	United Kingdom	A fishing smack foundered 6 nautical miles (11 km) off the Shetland Islands with the loss of all four crew.
Unnamed	United Kingdom	A fishing yawl foundered off the Orkney Islands with the loss of all three crew.

== 10 December ==
List of shipwrecks: 10 December 1887
Ship	State	Description
John	United Kingdom	The barge was run into by the steamship Earl Percy (United Kingdom) and sank at Deptford, Kent.
Lizzie Perry	Canada	The barque was driven ashore and wrecked on Barbados. She was on a voyage from Port Eads, Louisiana, United States to Buenos Aires, Argentina.
Tyne Queen	United Kingdom	The steamship foundered in the North Sea with the loss of a crew member. Survivors were rescued by the smack Lena (United Kingdom). Tyne Queen was on a voyage from the River Tyne to Copenhagen, Denmark.

== 11 December ==
List of shipwrecks: 11 December 1887
Ship	State	Description
Albion	United Kingdom	The steamship was driven ashore on Lambay Island, County Dublin and was severely damaged. Her crew were rescued by the Coastguard. She was on a voyage from Glasgow, Renfrewshire to Cork.

== 12 December ==
List of shipwrecks: 12 December 1887
Ship	State	Description
A.B.C.D.	United Kingdom	The Thames barge was driven ashore at Walton-on-the-Naze, Essex. She was on a voyage from London to Harwich, Essex.
Brighouse	United Kingdom	The steamship ran aground on the Seven Stones Reef, Cornwall and sank. Her fifteen crew took to the lifeboats and reached theSevenstones Lightship ( Trinity House), from where they were rescued a fortnight later by the steamship Alert ( Trinity House). Brighouse was on a voyage from Bordeaux, Gironde, France to Cardiff, Glamorgan.
Cliff	United Kingdom	The Thames barge was driven ashore and wrecked at Newhaven, Sussex.
Huntsman	United Kingdom	The ketch was driven ashore and wrecked at Walton-on-the-Naze. Her crew were rescued.
Iris	United Kingdom	The smack was run into by the steamship Kenley (United Kingdom) and sank in the North Sea 20 nautical miles (37 km) off Flamborough Head, Yorkshire. Her crew were rescued by Kenley.
Juliana	United Kingdom	The ship was driven ashore at Hastings, Sussex.
Lufra	Norway	The steamship departed from Cardiff, Glamorgan, United Kingdom for Genoa, Italy. No further trace, reported overdue.
Ohio	Flag unknown	The steamship ran aground in the Zuidergat. She was refloated.
Philanthropist	United Kingdom	The schooner was damaged by fire at "Pinsend".

== 13 December ==
List of shipwrecks: 13 December 1887
Ship	State	Description
Bee	United Kingdom	The schooner was driven ashore and wrecked at Hythe, Kent.
City of Perth	United Kingdom	The schooner collided with Rusoer (Norway) in the River Mersey and was abandoned with the loss of one life. City of Perth was on a voyage from Coleraine, County Antrim to Liverpool, Lancashire. She was subsequently towed in to Liverpool by the tug Storm Cock (United Kingdom).
Resolve	United Kingdom	The schooner was abandoned off Fishguard, Pembrokeshire. Her crew were rescued by the Fishguard Lifeboat. Resolve was on a voyage from Aberdeen to Bristol, Gloucestershire.

== 14 December ==
List of shipwrecks: 14 December 1887
Ship	State	Description
Brighouse	United Kingdom	The steamship was sighted off the Longships, Cornwall whilst on a voyage from Bordeaux, Gironde, France to Cardiff, Glamorgan. Presumed subsequently foundered with the loss of all sixteen crew; a lifeboat washed up a St. Ives, Cornwall on 16 December.
Lizzie Ella	United States	The sloop was lost in the Gulf of Mexico whilst on a fishing trip to the "Snapper Banks".
Peregrine White	United States	The fishing schooner was wrecked at Hermitage Bay, Newfoundland Colony. Her crew were rescued.
Sancho	United Kingdom	The ship was sighted off St. Helen's, Isle of Wight whilst on a voyage from the River Tyne to Bonanza, Spain. No further trace, reported missing.

== 15 December ==
List of shipwrecks: 15 December 1887
Ship	State	Description
James	United Kingdom	The barge was run down and sunk at Deptford, Kent by the steamship Rainbow (United Kingdom).

== 17 December ==
List of shipwrecks: 17 December 1887
Ship	State	Description
Alice Fisher	United Kingdom	The schooner foundered in the Crosby Channel in the Mersey Estuary.
Elizabeth Dawson	Sweden	The schooner foundered in the North Sea with the loss of two of her crew. Survivors were rescued by the steamship Toledo (United Kingdom). Elizabeth Dawson was on a voyage from Hull, Yorkshire, United Kingdom to Vyborg, Grand Duchy of Finland.
Orion	United Kingdom	The brigantine became stranded on the breakwater at Plymouth, Devon and was wrecked. Her crew were rescued. She was on a voyage from Plymouth to Teignmouth, Devon.

== 18 December ==
List of shipwrecks: 18 December 1887
Ship	State	Description
Grace L. Fears	United States	The fishing schooner was lost in a storm.
Hjemlos	Norway	The barque was driven ashore and wrecked at "Cymran", Anglesey, United Kingdom. Her crew were rescued by the Rhoscolyn Lifeboat. She was on a voyage from Belfast, County Antrim, United Kingdom to Grimstad.

== 19 December ==
List of shipwrecks: 19 December 1887
Ship	State	Description
Forest	United Kingdom	The steamship ran aground in the Mervion at Bilbao, Spain. She subsequently became a wreck.

== 20 December ==
List of shipwrecks: 20 December 1887
Ship	State	Description
Enterprise	United Kingdom	The ketch was run into by the steamship Raleigh (United Kingdom) and sank in the River Thames near Erith, Kent. She was refloated the next day.
Pembroke Castle	United Kingdom	The steamship ran aground on the Thunderbolt Reef, off the mouth of the Shark River, Cape Colony. She was on a voyage from Cape Town to Port Elizabeth. She was refloated and put back to Cape Town in a leaky condition.

== 21 December ==
List of shipwrecks: 21 December 1887
Ship	State	Description
Flora	United Kingdom	The schooner was driven ashore in the Thames Estuary near Higham, Kent. She was on a voyage from London to South Shields, County Durham.
Merchant Prince	United Kingdom	The steamship caught fire at Bremerhaven, Germany.
Pembroke Castle	United Kingdom	The steamship ran aground off Cape Recife, Cape Colony.
Phönix	Denmark	The schooner was run into by the steamship Galvanic (United Kingdom) at London. She was beached with assistance from the tug Britannia (United Kingdom) but consequently sank.

== 22 December ==
List of shipwrecks: 22 December 1887
Ship	State	Description
Friedeburg	United Kingdom	The ship was sighted in the Atlantic Ocean whilst on a voyage from Pisagua, Chile to a British port. No further trace, reported missing.
Glenavon	United Kingdom	The ship was sighted in the Atlantic Ocean whilst on a voyage from Astoria, Oregon, United States to Liverpool, Lancashire. No further trace, reported missing.
Louise	United Kingdom	The sloop ran aground and sank off Saint-Valery-sur-Somme, Somme, France. She was on a voyage from Swansea, Glamorgan to Le Hourdel, Somme.
Peconic	United Kingdom	The steamship caught fire at Liverpool, Lancashire.

== 23 December ==
List of shipwrecks: 23 December 1887
Ship	State	Description
Lively	United Kingdom	The lighter caught fire and sank 3 nautical miles (5.6 km) off the mouth of the River Tyne. Her crew were rescued by the tug Flying Scotchman (United Kingdom), which was towing Lively from Middlesbrough, Yorkshire to Newcastle upon Tyne, Northumberland.
Newcastle City	United Kingdom	The steamship struck a shoal in the Nantucket Shoals, 40 nautical miles (74 km; 46 mi) southeast of Nantucket, Massachusetts. She sank within sight of the Nantucket Lightship ( United States Lighthouse Board). All 27 people on board reached the lightship in two lifeboats. They were rescued on 7 January 1888. Newcastle City was on a voyage from South Shields, County Durham to New York, United States. Divers discovered her wreck in 2008 in 100 feet (30 m) of water at 40°37′N 069°37′W.
Roelas	Spain	The steamship was run into by the steamship Cascapedia (United Kingdom) and sank at Liverpool, Lancashire, United Kingdom. Her crew were rescued by the tug Sailor Prince (United Kingdom).
Strathnairn	United Kingdom	The steamship ran aground in the Clyde at Port Glasgow, Renfrewshire.

== 24 December ==
List of shipwrecks: 24 December 1887
Ship	State	Description
Algitha	United Kingdom	The steamship departed from the River Tyne for Savona, Italy. No further trace, reported missing, presumed foundered with the loss of all 23 crew.
Nellie Martin	United States	The schooner was driven ashore and wrecked on rocks at the south end of Douglas Island, District of Alaska. Both crew survived. She was on a voyage from Juneau to Shakan, District of Alaska.
Union	Germany	The steamship caught fire in the North Sea 10 nautical miles (19 km) off Flamborough Head, Yorkshire, United Kingdom. Four of her ten crew were rescued by the steamship Allerwash (United Kingdom). Union was on a voyage from Schiedam, South Holland, Netherlands to Charleston, South Carolina, United States. She was towed in to Bridlington, Yorkshire by Allerwash. She was subsequently towed in to Hull, Yorkshire on 27 December.

== 25 December ==
List of shipwrecks: 25 December 1887
Ship	State	Description
Chibine	(Ottoman Empire) Egypt	The steamship ran aground at Suakin. She was on a voyage from Suakin to Aden, Aden Governorate. She was refloated and resumed her voyage.
Darien	United Kingdom	The steamship departed from Cardiff, Glamorgan for Livorno, Italy. No further trace, reported missing.
Delveti Dubrovacki	Austria-Hungary	The barque collided with the steamship Pathan (United Kingdom) and sank in the English Channel 6 nautical miles (11 km) off Beachy Head, Sussex, United Kingdom with the loss of two of the fourteen people on board. Survivors were rescued by Pathan. Delveti Dubrovacki was on a voyage from Leith, Lothian, United Kingdom to Demerara, British Honduras.
Granton	United Kingdom	The steamship collided with the steamship Vivo (United Kingdom) in the River Thames at Purfleet, Essex and was beached. Granton was on a voyage from Amsterdam, North Holland, Netherlands to London. She was refloated on 27 December and taken in to Deptford, Kent.
Hilding	Sweden	The steamship was driven ashore north of Söderhamn.

== 26 December ==
List of shipwrecks: 26 December 1887
Ship	State	Description
Climax	United Kingdom	The schooner sank in the Swillies.
Lord Collingwood	United Kingdom	The ship was sighted off Gibraltar whilst on a voyage from the River Tyne to Savona, Italy. No further trace, reported missing, presumed foundered with the loss of all 45 crew.
25 unnamed vessels	Flags unknown	The ships were driven shore and wrecked in the Gulf of Patras.

== 27 December ==
List of shipwrecks: 27 December 1887
Ship	State	Description
Demerara	United Kingdom	The steamship was sighted 200 nautical miles (370 km) south of the Isles of Scilly whilst on a voyage from Liverpool, Lancashire to Gibraltar. No further trace, reported overdue.

== 29 December ==
List of shipwrecks: 29 December 1887
Ship	State	Description
Maud	United Kingdom	The steamship foundered in the Black Sea 130 nautical miles (240 km) south of Sulina, Romania with the loss of six of her eighteen crew. Survivors took to a boat; they were rescued three days later by the barque Theodora (Greece). Maud was on a voyage from Sulina to Gibraltar.

== 30 December ==
List of shipwrecks: 30 December 1887
Ship	State	Description
Kaieteur	United Kingdom	The steamship was abandoned in the Atlantic Ocean 70 nautical miles (130 km) off Cape Finisterre, Spain. Her crew were rescued by the steamship Hecla (United Kingdom). Kaieteur was on a voyage from Messina, Sicily, Italy to Rouen, Seine-Inférieure, France.

== 31 December ==
List of shipwrecks: 31 December 1887
Ship	State	Description
Henry and Richard	United States	The schooner was abandoned in the Atlantic Ocean (32°46′N 77°34′W). All fourteen people on board were rescued by the steamship Timor (Flag unknown). Henry and Richard was on a voyage from Boston, Massachusetts to Martinique.
Lancaster	United Kingdom	The steamship ran aground on the Shab Ali Reef, in the Red Sea. She was on a voyage from Liverpool, Lancashire to Bombay, India.
Lombardian, and Uganda	United Kingdom	The barque Lombardian ran into the steamship Uganda and capsized at Middlesbrough, Yorkshire and capsized. Uganda was severely damaged.

== Unknown date ==
List of shipwrecks: Unknown date in December 1887
Ship	State	Description
Aeron Queen	United Kingdom	The schooner sprang a leak and was abandoned in the Irish Sea off Swan Island.
Agnes	United Kingdom	The ship sank in the Thames Estuary. She was refloated on 18 December and beached at Mucking, Essex.
Alejandro	Spain	The brigantine was driven ashore and wrecked at Bahia Blanca, Brazil.
Ardgay	United Kingdom	The steamship was driven ashore at Cape Balangan, Netherlands East Indies. She was abandoned as a total loss.
Bear	United Kingdom	The steamship ran aground on the Craigmore Rocks, in the Firth of Forth and sank. She was on a voyage from Middlesbrough, Yorkshire to Grangemouth, Stirlingshire.
Ciscar	Spain	The steamship arrived at Gijón from Hamburg, Germany on fire. She was scuttled.
Clapeyron	United Kingdom	The steamship ran aground near Maassluis, South Holland, Netherlands. She was refloated on 1 January 1888.
Climax	United Kingdom	The ship ran aground on the Britannia Rock, in the Irish Sea off the coast of Anglesey. She floated off and came ashore on Anglesey.
Dauntless	United Kingdom	The steamship struck the pier and sank at IJmuiden, North Holland, Netherlands and sank.
Dowlais	United Kingdom	The ship ran aground in the Danube 25 nautical miles (46 km) from its mouth. She was refloated.
Ecossaise	United Kingdom	The steamship was driven ashore and severely damaged at Gijón, Spain.
Edouard Raoul	France	The barque was wrecked at Sulina, Brazil. All on board were rescued.
Edvidge	Austria-Hungary	The barque was destroyed by fire at Buenos Aires, Argentina.
Firm	Norway	The brigantine was driven ashore at Dungeness, Kent, United Kingdom. She was on a voyage from Antwerp, Belgium to Pernambuco, Brazil. She was refloated and put in to Dover, Kent in a leaky condition.
Flamingo	Norway	The brig was driven ashore and wrecked at Trouville-sur-Mer, Calvados, France. Her crew were rescued. She was refloated and taken in to Trouville-sur-Mer in a severely leaky condition.
Florence J. Henderson	United Kingdom	The ship was abandoned in the Atlantic Ocean. Her crew were rescued. She was on a voyage from Jamaica to New York.
Henriette	Flag unknown	The ship was abandoned at sea. She was on a voyage from Lunenburg, Nova Scotia, Canada to Martinique.
James Wilkie	United Kingdom	The ship was driven ashore and wrecked at Stavanger, Norway.
Johanna	United Kingdom	The barque was destroyed by fire at sea with the loss of eight of her sixteen crew. Survivors were rescued by the barque Carleton (Flag unknown). Johanna was on a voyage from South Shields, County Durham to Iquique, Chile.
Italia	United Kingdom	The steamship was driven ashore in the River Tees at Redcar, Yorkshire. She was on a voyage from Middlesbrough to Belfast, County Antrim.
Jehu	United Kingdom	The schooner collided with Recepta (United Kingdom) 15 nautical miles (28 km) south east of Whitby, Yorkshire. Jehu was on a voyage from Newcastle upon Tyne, Northumberland to Exmouth, Devon. She was assisted in to Whitby, where she sank.
Jessmore	United Kingdom	The steamship was driven ashore near Ouessant, Finistère. Her crew survived. She was on a voyage from Galaţi, Romania to Antwerp. She subsequently sank.
J. L. B.	United Kingdom	The ship was driven ashore at "Cape Ball".
John Ray	United Kingdom	The steamship sank at Sunderland, County Durham.
Jura	United Kingdom	The ship was abandoned at sea. Her crew were rescued. She was on a voyage from Bridgwater, Somerset to Madeira.
Lady Tyler	United Kingdom	The steamship ran aground at Maassluis.
Lanoy	United Kingdom	The barque was driven ashore on Inagua, Bahamas. She was on a voyage from Navassa Island to Bristol, Gloucestershire. She was refloated and taken in to Kingston, Jamaica.
Libero	Austria-Hungary	The barque was abandoned in the Mediterranean Sea. Her crew were rescued. She was on a voyage from Alexandria, Egypt to Savona, Italy.
Lord Charlemont	United Kingdom	The ship ran aground in the Yangon River. She was later refloated and taken in to Rangoon, Burma.
Machin	Spain	The steamship was driven ashore and damage at Point Ajó, near Cartagena.
Marie	United States	The ship was driven ashore at Sandy Hook, New Jersey. She was on a voyage from New York to Saint Martin's. She was refloated and put back to New York in a leaky condition.
Mary	United Kingdom	The smack was abandoned in the North Sea. Her crew were rescued by the steamship Saxon Prince (United Kingdom). Mary was on a voyage from Leith, Lothian to Peterhead, Aberdeenshire.
Mary Evans	United Kingdom	The ship was wrecked at Santos, Brazil. Her crew survived.
Mary Sinclair	United Kingdom	The schooner was driven ashore at Passage West, County Cork.
Mereo	Germany	The steamship was driven ashore and severely damaged at "Selero", Denmark. She was on a voyage from Burntisland, Fife, United Kingdom to Flensburg. She was refloated and put in to Helsingør, Denmark.
Neptune	Sweden	The barque was abandoned at sea. She was discovered by the steamship Bilbao (Spain), which towed her in to Cartagena, Spain.
Ocean	Norway	The barque ran aground in the Castletown River. She was on a voyage from Quebec City, Canada to Dundalk, County Louth, United Kingdom.
Paolina	Norway	The schooner was wrecked on Cape Sacheve, Finistèrre, France. She was on a voyage from Portimão, Portugal to Antwerp.
Penelope	United Kingdom	The steamship ran aground on Sondre Rosse, in the Baltic Sea. She was on a voyage from Copenhagen, Denmark to Riga, Russia.
Planet	United Kingdom	The steamship was driven ashore at the Coal House Fort, Essex. She was on a voyage from London to Antwerp.
Pluto	Germany	The full-rigged ship was run down and sunk in the Elbe by the steamship Carl Woermann (Germany).
Presto	Sweden	The brig foundered at sea. She was on a voyage from Middlesbrough to Karlshamn.
Prima	Denmark	The schooner sprang a leak and was abandoned off Öland, Sweden. Her crew were rescued by the steamship Vesta (Sweden). Prima was on a voyage from Söderhamn, Sweden to Copenhagen. She subsequently came ashore at "Torsnas", Öland.
Prima Donna	France	The barque was destroyed by fire at sea. Her crew were rescued.
Rebecca	United Kingdom	The brigantine was driven ashore 1 nautical mile (1.9 km) north of Dunwich, Suffolk. Her crew were rescued by rocket apparatus. She was on a voyage from Rotterdam, South Holland to Plymouth, Devon.
Renown	Germany	The barque sank off Den Helder, North Holland with the loss of five of her 30 crew. Survivors were rescued by a lifeboat between 9 and 12 December.
R. F. Matthews	United Kingdom	The steamship ran ashore on the north coast of Anholt, Denmark.
Riberia	United Kingdom	The ship was driven ashore at Sandwich, Kent.
Rosa Bianchi	Italy	The barque struck a rock and was wrecked at "Tjiparage", Netherlands East Indies. Her crew survived.
San Luigi	Italy	The ship was wrecked at Cape Palos, Spain with some loss of life. She was on a voyage from Civita Vecchia to Alicante, Spain.
Scotland	United Kingdom	The ship was driven ashore at Seagirt, Maryland. She was on a voyage from Liverpool, Lancashire to New York.
Sebulon	Norway	The barque was driven ashore and wrecked in the Dry Tortugas. She was on a voyage from Minatitlán, Mexico to Queenstown, County Cork, United Kingdom.
Septima	Flag unknown	The ship was driven ashore on Pulo Obi, French Indo-China. She was refloated and taken in to Saigon, French Indo-China in a leaky condition.
Skyro	United Kingdom	The steamship ran aground at Kastrup, Denmark. She was on a voyage from Sundsvall, Sweden to Dordrecht, South Holland, Netherlands. She was refloated and resumed her voyage.
Smiling Morn	United Kingdom	The smack was driven ashore at Dimlington, Yorkshire. Five of her crew were rescued by rocket apparatus.
Star of Peace	United Kingdom	The ship was driven ashore and wrecked at Amble, Northumberland. Her crew were rescued.
Stjernen	Norway	The schooner was lost at Rive de Sella, Spain. Her crew were rescued.
Stockholm City	United Kingdom	The steamship was driven ashore in the River Thames at Barking, Essex. She was on a voyage from London to Boston.
Transfear	United Kingdom	The schooner ran aground on the Nore.
Vibilia	United Kingdom	The barque was driven ashore at Martha's Vineyard, Massachusetts, United States. She was on a voyage from Pernambuco, Brazil to New York. She was refloated.
Volunteer	United Kingdom	The sloop was driven ashore at Donaghadee, County Down. She was on a voyage from Glasgow, Renfrewshire to Donaghadee. She was refloated and found to be severely leaky.
Wasp	United Kingdom	The schooner was wrecked at Stockpool Head, Pembrokeshire. Her crew were rescued.
Wetherby	United Kingdom	The steamship ran aground on the Ketelplaat, in the North Sea off the coast of Zeeland, Netherlands. She was on a voyage from Antwerp to Colón, Colombia.
Will Dawn	United Kingdom	The smack was driven ashore near Withernsea, Yorkshire. Her crew were rescued.
HMS Wrangler	Royal Navy	The Banterer-class gunboat was severely damaged in a hurricane. She put in to the Turks Islands on 7 December.
York City	United Kingdom	The steamship ran aground on the Salvo Reef, off Gotland, Sweden and sank. Her crew were rescued.
Unnamed	Flag unknown	A schooner caught fire off the Bar Lightship ( Trinity House). Her crew were believed to have survived.
Unnamed	Haiti	A schooner capsized in a hurricane off Cap-Haïtien between 6 and 8 December with the loss of thirteen of her crew.
Unnamed	United Kingdom	A schooner capsized in a hurricane with the loss of thirteen of her crew.
