= Scouting and Guiding in Kuwait =

The Scout and Guide movement in Kuwait is served by two organisations

- Kuwait Girl Guides Association, member of the World Association of Girl Guides and Girl Scouts
- Kuwait Boy Scouts Association, member of the World Organization of the Scout Movement

== International Scouting units in Kuwait ==
In addition, there are American Boy Scouts in a couple of regions, Safat and Al-Zour, linked to the Direct Service branch of the Boy Scouts of America, which supports units around the world, as well as Girl Scouts of the USA and British Scouts.
