= List of shipwrecks of the Seven Stones Reef =

The List of shipwrecks of the Seven Stones Reef lists the ships which sank on or near the reef, including ships that sustained a damaged hull, which were later refloated and repaired. The Seven Stones Reef is a rocky reef nearly 15 miles (24 km) to the west-north-west (WNW) of Land's End, Cornwall and 7 miles (11 km) east-north-east (ENE) of the Isles of Scilly. The reef consists of two groups of rocks and is nearly 2 miles (3.2 km) long and 1 mile (1.6 km) in breadth. They rise out of deep water and are a navigational hazard for shipping with seventy-one named wrecks and an estimated two hundred shipwrecks overall. The most infamous is the Torrey Canyon in 1967, which was at that time the world's costliest shipping disaster, and to date, still the worst oil spill on the coast of the United Kingdom.

A lightvessel has been moored near the reef and exhibiting light since 1 September 1841. It is permanently anchored in 40 fathoms (73 m) and is 2.5 miles (4.0 km) north-east (NE) of the reef. It has been in situ almost continuously, except when it has dragged its anchor, removed for safety during the Second World War or for a few days while the Torrey Canyon was bombed by the military.

== Shipwrecks ==
=== 17th century ===
- March 1656 – the sixth-rate, 22 gun English man-o'-war, Primrose lost her main topmast off the Longships and drifted onto the Seven Stones. She was searching the area between Cornwall and the Isles of Scilly, along with the Mayflower, for two Spanish frigates which had captured a vessel bound for Bristol. She managed to free herself from the reef and sank in 60 fathoms (110 m) taking sixteen men, two women and a child with her. Primrose was the first named loss on the reef.
- 30 November 1674 — Revenge wrecked with the loss of fifteen of her seventeen crew.

=== 18th century ===
- 27 February 1747 — fourteen gun sloop HMS Lizard was wrecked, with the loss of over one hundred crew.

=== 19th century ===
==== 1800s ====
- 12 February 1802 — the Fortune struck the reef while carrying a general cargo from Dublin to London. Her crew were rescued by a Yarmouth brig while the Fortune sank with the loss of two Tresco pilots who were attempting to save the ship.
- 14 November 1805 — bound from Dublin to London, the brig Perseverance (United Kingdom) struck the reef during fog. Her crew rowed to St Mary's.

==== 1810s ====
- 25 May 1810 — Renovation (United Kingdom) was stranded and a total loss while en route from Cardiff to London with coal.
- 6 November 1810 — Exeter brig Reward was lost while bound from Limerick with oats and butter.
- 11 December 1811 — while bound for Cork from Lisbon with a cargo of cork the Aurora became a total loss when she stranded on the reef.
- 5 May 1814 — Hope was wrecked.

==== 1820s ====
- 16 January 1826 — two unidentified schooners were wrecked; one disappeared from view immediately and the second was lost with all hands.
- 2 November 1827 — Susanna (or Susan) (United States) of Boston sank after hitting the reef, while en route from Matanzas to Hamburg with logwood and cotton. All the crew bar one were saved by the Tresco pilot boat Hope.

==== 1830s ====
- 18 November 1833 — Sunderland brig Joseph (United Kingdom) carrying pig iron from Cardiff to London was wrecked.
- 16 May 1837 — barque Golden Spring (United Kingdom) hit the reef in fog and refloated at high water.
- 18 November 1838 — while taking on a pilot, the Indiaman Larkins struck three times, floated free and with a leak. Captain Ingram, passengers and the mail were transferred to the pilot cutter leaving the crew on board. Larkins reached Falmouth with 8-foot of water in her hold but still manage to discharge her cargo of indigo, silk and saltpetre.

==== 1840s ====
- 4 October 1840 — Scilly registered schooner Flying Fish (United Kingdom) was nearly a total loss when she hit the reef and her crew was picked up by St Martin's fishermen.
- 29 September 1848 — Barnstaple schooner Caroline (United Kingdom) struck the reef and foundered in thick fog while carrying coal from Newport to Tarragona. The only survivor, the mate, was rescued by one of the lightship's longboat. The same longboat capsized on 15 October 1851 killing two of the crew while returning from Scilly with stores.

==== 1850s ====
- 23 April 1851 — Exeter brig Amethyst (United Kingdom) hit the reef in poor visibility and sank within six hours, while en route from Teignmouth to Quebec with china clay. Her crew was saved by the barque Mary Laing.
- 12 June 1853 — brig Ambassador carrying coal to Malta from Cardiff hit the reef in fine weather and sank within fifteen minutes. Her crew reached the lightship in the ship's boats.
- 2 February 1854 — Full-rigged Cape Horner America of Saint John, New Brunswick hit the reef and sank within an hour. She was sailing from Callao to Queenstown and London with guano. Her crew was picked up by Isles of Scilly boat New Prosperous and landed near St Ives.
- 27 April 1859 — Newlyn fishing vessel Fame (United Kingdom) capsized in a severe east-south-east (ESE) gale while running for Scilly for shelter. There were no survivors.

==== 1860s ====
- 14 September 1860 — barque Punjab (United Kingdom) of Sunderland carrying 300 tons of wool and hides to Amsterdam from Algoa Bay hit the reef. The crew and passengers, bar one, were rescued by the Joshua and Mary and landed at Falmouth.
- 25 April 1866 — Sunderland barque Cubana struck the reef when both her master and mate were asleep below. She was bound for St Jago, Cuba with sixteen crew, one passenger and a cargo of coal, iron and mining gear. Ten of the crew and the passenger took to one of the boats and rowed to the lightship and transferred to St Mary's by pilot cutter.
- 18 September 1866 — schooner Emilie (United Kingdom) sank in five minutes after hitting the reef in fog, while bound from Poole for Runcorn. The crew of five survived.
- 8 May 1868 — 135 ton brig Gleaner (United Kingdom) of Newport was thought to have hit the reef and sank 30 miles NW by w of Land's End.
- 31 August 1869 — SS Oxus (United Kingdom) of Dundee on voyage from Akyab and Queenstown to London with rice, mistook the Seven Stones lightship for the Longships Lighthouse and, setting a course to avoid the Wolf struck a ledge known as the ″Town″ near the Seven Stones reef. The crew of fourteen managed to launch the gig as Oxus sank within five minutes; with only four oars in an overloaded boat it took them fifteen hours to row to the lightship.

==== 1870s ====
- 4 April 1870 — St Peterborg en route from Glasgow to Rotterdam struck a submerged wreck and foundered.
- 6 October 1870 — Fleetwood registered barque Nelson (United Kingdom) carrying pig iron and esparto grass from Aquias for the Tyne hit either the South Stone or the Flemish Ledges. Three men drowned and the remaining made it to the lightvessel.
- 24 June 1871 — 600 ton barque Primos or (Il Primo) (Spain) from Bilbao carrying sugar from Havana to Falmouth for orders. Ten of her eleven crew drowned except for Vincenzo Defelice who swam for two hours before finding a hen-coop on which he climbed. He later spotted and climbed onto the ship's figurehead, which is now in the Valhalla collection at Tresco Abbey Gardens and later managed to get aboard one of the ship's boats when it drifted close by. He rowed to English Island Neck at St Martin's where he was picked up by a pilot-gig.
- 3 February 1873 — unidentified brigantine foundered in heavy seas. The captain of a nearby French schooner decided it was too dangerous to approach the wreck, leaving those on board to drown.
- December — an unidentified fully rigged ship wrecked.
- 20 April 1874 — 1,780 ton Rydall Hall still sank despite being taken in tow by the Queen of the Bay. She lost most of her head gear while on her maiden voyage from San Francisco with a general cargo. The packet ship received £150.
- 14 February 1875 — the 299 ton barque Floresta grounded on the reef in fog and quickly sank; her crew of ten were landed at Falmouth by the St Malo lugger Josephine.
- 13 November 1876 — schooner Paul et Marie (France) carrying wheat was dismasted after hitting the reef. She was later brought into Scilly as a derelict.
- 6 July 1877 — the Glasgow sailing ship Barremann (United Kingdom) hit the Pollard Rock with the loss of all of the twenty-seven crew. The 1400 ton ship was on voyage from South Shields to San Francisco with coal, pig-iron and cement.
- 16 October 1877 — William Van Name (United States) struck the reef while bound for Queenstown for orders. Captain Cogniss and his crew of eleven was picked up by the schooner Caroline of Looe and landed at Penzance.
- 1877 — schooner Ethel (United Kingdom) struck the reef but sustained little damage and headed for Plymouth. Her captain and mate had their certificates withdrawn.
- 26 February 1879 — brig Rosaire (France) of Nantes carrying coal from Newport to Brest struck the reef and went down. Three men drowned and four of her crew were picked up by the pilot cutter Queen, off Crow Sound, Isles of Scilly.

==== 1880s ====
- 13 September 1884 — an unidentified brig sank. Two days later several pieces of recently broken wood-work and a carpet broom with Edward Lane, Texas cut into the handle, was found at Old Town Bay, Isles of Scilly; which may be from this vessel. Alternatively a large brig ″no doubt from″ Queenstown disappeared east-south-east of the Seven Stones.
- 29 September 1885 — barque Elizabeth Graham (United Kingdom) of London grounded and refloated.
- 20 August 1886 — the crew of the Plymouth schooner Jane Sophia (United Kingdom) was saved after she collided with the steamer Zenobia and sank.
- 9 July 1887 — the Glasgow sailing ship, Barremann (United Kingdom) hit the Pollard Rock with the loss of all of the twenty-seven crew. She was on voyage from South Shields, County Durham to San Francisco, California.
- 12 December 1887 — iron steamship Brighouse (United Kingdom) hit the reef in fog. Her crew took to the lifeboats and had to stay for two weeks on the Sevenstones Lightship. Brighouse was on passage from Bordeaux to Cardiff with pitwood.

==== 1890s ====
- 28 October 1890 — 77 ton schooner Benton survived hitting the Pollard Rock, made it to Falmouth full of water and with her cargo of china clay intact.
- 5 February 1891 — 1,261 ton steamship Chiswick (United Kingdom) ran aground, in calm weather, on the North-east ledges, while bound for St Nazaire with coal from Cardiff. The captain is supposed to have said "every man for himself" before going down, along with ten crew, and his ship. Eight survivors were picked up by the lightship's longboat.
- 5 December 1891 — Merannio (United Kingdom) en route for Newport from Bilbao with 1,300 of iron ore hit the Seven Stones, but managed to reach St Ives where a 10-foot hole was found in her bow.
- 1 October 1892 — despite warning signals from the Seven Stones lightship, the Newcastle steamer SS Camiola (United Kingdom) struck the reef at full speed and quickly sank; all of her crew managed to get into the ship's two boats. She was carrying 3,400 tons of coal from Cardiff to Naples, or Barry Docks to Malta.
- 5 July 1897 — the steamer Heathmore (United Kingdom) of Liverpool ran into the reef at full speed while en route from Santander to Glasgow with 2,400 tons of iron-ore. She floated clear and anchored two miles away with the crew pumping water out of the ship. The crew pumped all day and by evening they took to the boats and was picked up by the Lady of the Isles.

=== 20th century ===
- 15 June 1905 — Milford Haven steam trawler Hydrangea (United Kingdom) was heading for the fishing grounds off Scilly but was off course and hit the reef. Her crew reached the lightship.
- 20 June 1908 — Douarnenez crabber St Lewis (France) struck the reef and foundered.
- 3 August 1911 — 180 ton schooner Frau Mini Peterson (Norway) wrecked after a collision.
- 6 December 1911 – 1,132 ton Antwerp steamer Van Dyck (Belgium) collided with the reef while carrying oranges from Valencia to Liverpool. Eighteen of the crew escaped in a lifeboat which capsized killing the captain and thirteen men. The steamer refloated herself, drifted in the channel with four men still on board, and the collier Ashtree made a failed attempt to take the vessel in tow. The four crew launched a raft and reached the Ashtree. The derelict was taken in tow by the Lyonesse and Greencastle, and was beached at Penzance on 8 December. She was later returned to service.
- 12 March 1912 — the Glasgow sailing vessel Wendur (United Kingdom) struck the southernmost rock of the reef while carrying grain from Plymouth. Three of the twenty-one crew lost their lives. She held the record for the fastest voyage between Newcastle and Valparaíso.
- 11 June 1913 — Toanui (United Kingdom) of Glasgow lost on the reef. Wreckage was washed up around Land's End and Tol Pedn.
- 24 July 1918 — HMS Pincher a 975-ton Beagle-class destroyer was wrecked on the reef while escorting the Standard tanker, War Hostage.
- 28 November 1924 — steamer Cornish Coast stranded. She survived and was involved in an incident with the sinking of the steamer Fagerness off Trevose Head in March 1926.
- 23 December 1927 — schooner Gougou (France) dismasted 300m from the lightvessel. The crew of seven men were taken off by the St Mary's lifeboat and the Gougou was picked up the next day by Trinity vessel SS Mermaid and towed to Penzance.
- 22 December 1939 — the SS Longships (United Kingdom) broke her back after striking the reef while sailing from Belfast to Plymouth. Her crew was saved by the St Mary's lifeboat, Cunard.
- 19 April 1948 — Duke of Sparta bound for London from Liverpool stranded on the reef and refloated on same day – the only ship to get off the reef in modern times.
- 6 October 1949 — 6,300 ton cargo ship of the Elder Dempster Line Fantree struck the Flemish Ledges. Her cargo of hardwood was still being salvaged in 1992. Her crew of fifty-eight were rescued by launches Kittern and Goldern Spray from Scilly.
- 22 July 1955 — Panamanian registered steamer Punta (Panama) drove onto the reef and was abandoned by her crew. She filled and sank soon afterwards.
- 18 March 1967 — Torrey Canyon ran aground on Pollard's Rock, loaded with 120,000 tonnes of crude oil. The vessel released 31,000 gallons of oil much of which washed up on the Cornish, Brittany and Guernsey coasts.
- 29 September 1976 — 2,186 ton (Polish People's Republic) Polish factory trawler Rarau with a (Romania) Romanian crew of eighty-four drove into the northern part of the reef known as the North-east Rocks. All the crew were rescued and the trawler slipped into deep water.

== See also ==
- List of shipwrecks of Cornwall
- List of shipwrecks of the Isles of Scilly

== Notes ==
1. Until 1752, the year began on Lady Day (25 March). Thus 24 March 1747 was followed by 25 March 1748. 31 December 1748 was followed by 1 January 1748.
