= Seven Stones =

Seven Stones and similar may refer to:

- Seven stones (game), a traditional Indian game
- Seven Stones Reef, a rock reef off the coast of England
  - Sevenstones Lightship
- Seven Stones (song), a 1971 song by Genesis

== See also ==
- Sevenstone, a retail development in Sheffield, England
