= Ahmadi Governorate =

Governorate of Kuwait

Ahmadi Governorate محافظة الأحمدي Muḥāfaẓat al-Aḥmadī
- Governorate
- Headquarters of Kuwait National Petroleum Company

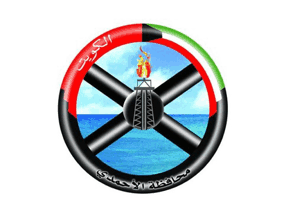
- Flag

- Map of Kuwait with Ahmadi highlighted
- Coordinates (Ahmadi): 29.077°N 48.084°E
- Country: Kuwait
- Seat: Ahmadi
- Areas: 29

Area
  - Total: 5,120 km^{2} (1,980 sq mi)

Population (2021)
  - Total: 923,784
  - Density: 180/km^{2} (467/sq mi)
- Time zone: UTC+03 (AST)
- ISO 3166 code: KW-AH

The Ahmadi Governorate (Note: Arabic: محافظة الأحمدي, romanized: Muḥāfaẓat al-Aḥmadī) is one of the six governorates of Kuwait. Established in 1962, the governorate covers an area of approximately 5,120 km^{2} (1,980 sq mi) and is subdivided into 29 areas. According to the 2021 census, it had a population of 923,784.

== History ==
The town of Ahmadi was founded in 1946 by the Kuwait Oil Company following the discovery of oil in 1938. It was developed as a planned settlement close to the Burgan Oil Field and incorporated housing, administrative facilities and social services. The first oil export from Kuwait was facilitated from Mina Al-Ahmadi in 1946. Along with Capital and Hawalli, Ahmadi Governorate was one of the three governorates established in 1962 when Kuwait was divided into governorates. It is named after former Emir Ahmad Al-Jaber Al-Sabah.

== Geography ==
Ahmadi Governorate is one of the six governorates of Kuwait. The governorate is situated in the southern part of Kuwait along the Persian Gulf bordering Saudi Arabia. It is bordered by the governorates of Jahra to the northwest, Farwaniya to the north, and Mubarak Al-Kabeer to the northeast. It occupies a land area of 5,120 km^{2} (1,980 sq mi), and is the second largest governorate by area in Kuwait. It is subdivided into 29 areas: Magwa, Dhaher, Jaber Al-Ali, Egaila, Al-Fintas, Hadiya, Riqqa, Mahboula, Mangaf, Fahaid Al-Ahmad, Abu Halifa, Sabahiya, South Sabahiya, Ahmadi, Fahaheel, North Shuaiba, South Shuaiba, Mina Abdullah, Sabah Al-Ahmad City, Ali Sabah Al-Salem, South Coast Strip, Al-Zour, Al-Khiran, Al-Nuwaiseeb, New Al-Khiran, Al-Wafra, New Al-Wafra, Al-Wafra Farms, and Ahmadi Desert.

== Demographics and housing ==
According to the 2021 census, Ahmadi Governorate had a population of 923,784, comprising 595,732 males and 328,052 females. It was the third most populated governorate in Kuwait after Farwaniya and Hawalli. About 740,360 were aged 15 and above, of which 445,806 were married, 264,706 had never married, 17,843 were divorced and 7,885 were widowed.

The coastal areas of the governorate are characterised by clear waters and beaches, and are home to numerous privately owned beach houses and chalets, which serve as weekend and holiday retreats for affluent Kuwaiti families. It also hosts several recreational clubs including the Kuwait Golf Club, and parks including the Ahmadi garden.

Kuwaiti citizens numbered 329,121, representing approximately 35.6% of the population, while non-Kuwaiti residents numbered 594,663, accounting for approximately 64.4%. The Kuwaiti population consisted of 162,729 males and 166,392 females, while the non-Kuwaiti population included 433,003 males and 161,660 females. The expatriate population included 356,402 from Gulf Cooperation Council countries, 138,936 from other Arab countries, and 411,953 from other Asian countries. The remaining population included 8,496 from sub-Saharan Africa, 2,700 from Europe, 4,615 from North America, 457 from South America, and 225 from Oceania.

== Economy ==
Ahmadi Governorate had 23,433 registered establishments, of which 23,077 were in the private sector. Wholesale and retail trade accounted for the largest number of establishments, with 7,649, followed by agriculture, forestry and fishing with 5,894 and accommodation and food service activities with 1,843. Of the population aged 15 years and above, 550,534 were employed. Manufacturing industries was the largest employment category, accounting for 127,556 people, followed by human health and social work activities with 103,225 and education with 71,060.

The governorate hosts several oil fields including the Burgan oil field and associated industries. The Mina Al-Ahmadi refinery, established in 1949, covers approximately 10.5 km^{2} (4.1 sq mi) and has a refining capacity of 346,000 barrels per day. The Mina Abdullah Refinery has a refining capacity of 454,000 barrels per day. It also includes the Fuhaiheel commercial area, and the Ahmadi garden and zoo.
