= Wadha Ahmed Al-Khateeb =

Wadha Al-Khateeb
- Education: College of Engineering and Petroleum, Kuwait University
- Title: Chief Executive Officer of Kuwait National Petroleum Company (KNPC)

Wadha Ahmed Al-Khateeb (Arabic: وضحى أحمد الخطيب) is a Kuwaiti businesswoman currently serving as the chief executive officer of Kuwait National Petroleum Company (KNPC), the acting CEO of the Kuwait Integrated Petroleum Industries Company, as well as the vice chairperson of the Gulf Downstream Association. She joined the KNPC in 1994 and was promoted to the role of KNPC's CEO in 2022.

== Education ==
Al-Khateeb holds a Bachelor of Science degree in chemical engineering from Kuwait University.

== Career ==
Prior to being the CEO of KNPC, she was the Deputy Chief Executive Officer of Mina Abdullah Refinery in 2019. She formerly contributed as a member of the Kuwait Paraxylene Production Company, K.S.C (TKSC) and was the former chairperson for the Kuwait Paraxylene Production Company, K.S.C (KPPC) which was appointed on May 5, 2019.
