= KNPC =

KNPC may refer to:

- KNPC (FM), a radio station (88.5 FM) licensed to Hardin, Montana, United States
- Kuwait National Petroleum Company
