= KBSA =

KBSA may refer to:

- KBSA (FM), a radio station (90.9 FM) licensed to serve El Dorado, Arkansas, United States
- KBSA-TV, former call sign of KFTR-DT, a television station (Channel 46) licensed to serve Ontario, California
- Knowledge Based Software Assistant, a research program funded by the United States Air Force
- Korea Baseball Softball Association, the South Korean governing body for the sports of baseball and softball
- Kuwait Boy Scouts Association
