= Mina Al-Ahmadi refinery =

Oil refinery in Kuwait

Coordinates: 29°03′36″N 48°07′54″E

Mina Al-Ahmadi Refinery
- Interactive map of Mina Al-Ahmadi Refinery
- Location: Mina Al-Ahmadi, Kuwait

Refinery details
- Operator: Kuwait National Petroleum Company (KNPC)
- Owner: Kuwait National Petroleum Company
- Opened: 1949
- Area: 10.5 km^{2} (4.1 sq mi)
- Capacity: 346,000 barrels per day (55,000 m^{3}/d)
- Refining units: 39

Mina Al-Ahmadi Refinery (MAA) is an oil refinery in Mina Al-Ahmadi, Kuwait. It is operated by the Kuwait National Petroleum Company (KNPC), a subsidiary of Kuwait Petroleum Corporation (KPC). Built in 1949, it was the first refinery in Kuwait.

Following the completion of KNPC's Clean Fuels Project, Mina Al-Ahmadi Refinery was upgraded as part of an integrated refining complex with the Mina Abdullah Refinery.

== History ==
Mina Al-Ahmadi Refinery was established in 1949 with an initial refining capacity of 25,000 barrels per day. Ownership of the refinery was transferred to KNPC in 1981. During the 1980s, the refinery underwent major modernization works, including a modernization project recorded by KNPC in 1986. Over time, the site was expanded with additional processing, storage and export-related infrastructure.

=== 2026 Iran war ===
During the 2026 Iran war, the refinery came under repeated Iranian drone attack. In March 2026, an attack caused fires in multiple units and led to the precautionary shutdown of several units at the site. The refinery was hit again on 3 April 2026, when another drone attack caused multiple fires; no casualties were reported.

== Operations ==
KNPC states that Mina Al-Ahmadi Refinery occupies about 10.5 square kilometres on the coast and, after its most recent upgrade programme, operates 39 upgraded units. The refinery produces low-sulfur petroleum products for both domestic use and export markets, including gasoline, kerosene, bitumen and liquefied petroleum gas.

The refinery also forms part of Kuwait's broader downstream system. According to the U.S. Energy Information Administration, the modernization of Mina Al-Ahmadi and Mina Abdullah under the Clean Fuels Project was completed in late 2021 and was intended to reduce sulfur and nitrogen oxide content in refined products while lowering emissions from refining operations.

== See also ==
- Kuwait National Petroleum Company
- Kuwait Petroleum Corporation
- Mina Abdullah refinery
- Al Zour Refinery
