= Torrey Canyon oil spill =

1967 oil spill off the coast of the UK

Coordinates: 50°2.50′N 6°7.73′W

The Torrey Canyon oil spill was one of the world's most serious oil spills. The supertanker SS Torrey Canyon ran aground on rocks off the south-west coast of the United Kingdom in 1967, spilling an estimated 25–36 million gallons (94–164 million litres) of crude oil. Attempts to mitigate the damage included the bombing of the wreck by aircraft from the Royal Navy and Royal Air Force. Hundreds of miles of coastline in Britain, France, Guernsey, and Spain were affected by the oil and other substances used to mitigate damage. It was the world's worst oil spill up to that point and led to significant changes in maritime law and oil spill responses.

== Background ==
When laid down in the United States in 1959, Torrey Canyon had a capacity of 60,000 tons; the ship was later enlarged to 120,000 tons in Japan. She was named for a geographical feature in California. Torrey Canyon was registered in Liberia and owned by Barracuda Tanker Corporation, a subsidiary of Union Oil Company of California but chartered to British Petroleum. She was 974.4 ft (297.0 m) long, with a 125.4 ft (38.2 m) beam and a 68.7 ft (20.9 m) draught.

== Accident ==
On her final voyage, Torrey Canyon left the Kuwait National Petroleum Company refinery at Mina Al-Ahmadi, Kuwait (later Al-Ahmadi), with a full cargo of crude oil, on 19 February 1967. The ship had an intended destination of Milford Haven in Wales. On 14 March, she reached the Canary Islands. Following a navigational error, Torrey Canyon struck Pollard's Rock on the extreme western end of the Seven Stones between the Cornish mainland and the Isles of Scilly on 18 March 1967.

The tanker did not have a scheduled route and so lacked a complement of full-scale charts of the Scilly Islands. When a collision with a fishing fleet became imminent, there was some confusion between the master and the officer of the watch as to their exact position. Significant further delay arose due to uncertainty as to whether the vessel was in manual or automatic steering mode, with the master mistakenly believing he had switched the steering to manual for the helmsman. By the time the problem was corrected, a grounding was unavoidable. In the hours and days to follow, extensive attempts to float the vessel off the reef failed and even resulted in the death of a member of the Dutch salvage team, Captain Hans Barend Stal.

After the attempts to move the vessel failed and the ship began to break up, the focus became the clean up and containment of the resulting oil spill. Huge amounts of detergent was used by Cornwall fire brigade and attending Royal Navy vessels to try to disperse the oil. UK Prime Minister Harold Wilson and his cabinet held a mini cabinet meeting at the Royal Naval Air Station Culdrose and decided to set fire to the vessel and surrounding oil slick to limit the extent of the oil disaster.

On 28 March 1967, the Fleet Air Arm sent Blackburn Buccaneer planes from RNAS Lossiemouth to drop forty-two 1,000 lb (450 kg) bombs on the ship. Then, the Royal Air Force sent Hawker Hunter jets from RAF Chivenor to drop cans of aviation fuel to make the oil blaze. Exceptionally high tides put the fire out and it took further bombing runs by Sea Vixens from the RNAS Yeovilton and Buccaneers from the Royal Navy Air Station Brawdy, as well as more RAF Hunters with liquefied petroleum jelly (napalm) to ignite the oil. Bombing continued into the next day before Torrey Canyon finally sank. About 161 1,000 lb (450 kg) bombs, 11,000 imp gal (50,000 L; 13,000 US gal) of kerosene, 3,000 imp gal (14,000 L; 3,600 US gal) of napalm and 16 other missiles had been aimed at the ship. Attempts to use foam-filled containment booms were mostly ineffectual because of the high seas.

== Environmental impact ==
About 50 miles (80 km) of French and 120 miles (190 km) of Cornish coast were contaminated. Around 15,000 sea birds were killed, along with huge numbers of marine organisms, before the 270 square miles (700 km^{2}) slick dispersed. Much damage was caused by the heavy use of so-called detergents to break up the slick – these were first-generation variants of products originally formulated to clean surfaces in ships' engine-rooms, with no concern over the toxicity of their components. Many observers believed that they were officially referred to as 'detergents', rather than the more accurate 'solvent-emulsifiers', to encourage comparison with much more benign domestic cleaning products.

Some 42 vessels sprayed over 10,000 tons of these dispersants onto the floating oil and they were also deployed against oil stranded on beaches. In Cornwall, they were often misused – for example, by emptying entire 45-gallon drums over the clifftop to treat inaccessible coves or by pouring a steady stream from a low-hovering helicopter. On the heavily oiled beach at Sennen Cove, dispersant pouring from drums was ploughed into the sand by bulldozers over a period of several days, burying the oil so effectively that it could still be found a year or more later.

Some of the oil from the ship was dumped in a quarry on the Chouet headland on Guernsey in the Channel Islands, where it remains. Efforts to rid the island of the oil have continued, with limited success.

== Aftermath ==
The British government was strongly criticised for its handling of the incident, which was at that time the costliest shipping disaster ever. The RAF and the Royal Navy were also subject to ridicule as a result of their efforts to assist in resolving the matter, given that as many as 25% of the 42 bombs that they dropped missed the enormous stationary target.

The British and French governments made claims against the owners of the vessel; the subsequent settlement was the largest ever in marine history for an oil claim. In traditional maritime law, ships can sue and be sued, but their liability is limited to the value of the ship and its cargo. After the Torrey Canyon was wrecked, its value was that of one remaining lifeboat worth $50, some 1/160,000 of the damages. Liberian law did not provide for direct liability of the ship's owners. The British government was able to serve a writ against the ship's owners only by arresting the Torrey Canyon's sister ship, the Lake Palourde, when she put in for provisions at Singapore, four months after the oil spill. A young British lawyer, Anthony O'Connor, from a Singaporean law firm, Drew & Napier, was deputised to arrest the ship on behalf of the British government by attaching a writ to its mast. O'Connor was able to board the ship and serve the writ because the ship's crew thought he was a whisky salesman. The French government, alerted to the Lake Palourde's presence, pursued the ship with motor boats, but crew were unable to board and serve their writ.

The disaster led to many changes in international regulations, such as the International Convention on Civil Liability for Oil Pollution Damage (CLC) of 1969, which imposed strict liability on ship owners without the need to prove negligence, and the 1973 International Convention for the Prevention of Pollution from Ships.

An inquiry in Liberia, where the ship was registered, found that the Shipmaster, Pastrengo Rugiati, was to blame for having made a bad decision in steering Torrey Canyon between the Scillies and the Seven Stones. The first officer made ill-advised course corrections while the captain slept. Safer course alternatives were discarded because of the pressure to arrive in port at Milford Haven by high tide on 18 March.

The problems of reducing death following "immersion hypothermia" which were highlighted by the disaster led to "development of new techniques for safety and rescue at sea" and changes in the way survivors are winched from the sea.

Two flaws have also been noted in the design of the steering control:

1. The steering lever was designed to switch the steering to a "Control mode", intended for use in maintenance only, which disconnected the rudder from the steering wheel.
2. The design of the steering selector unit did not provide an indication of the peculiar mode at the helm.

The wreck is now largely broken up and is scattered over a wide area.

The Royal Navy has two steering modes, Hand mode where the helmsman steers the ship keeping it on course and Auto Mode where the ship automatically steers itself on the course (monitored by the helmsman). If for some reason the ship needs to be returned to hand mode a button is pushed to switch to hand, if that fails the Wheel (Helm) is forced hard to Port or Starboard where it is taken out of Auto by an override switch, this switch is called the Torrey Canyon switch.

== In popular culture ==
Botanist David Bellamy came to public prominence as an environmental consultant during the disaster. He made his first prominent TV appearances after publishing a report on the episode. He went on to be a leading environmental and nature campaigner for decades.

In 1967 French singer Serge Gainsbourg wrote a song called "Torrey Canyon", about the disaster, which appears on the B-side of his single "Comic Strip" and on his 1968 album Initials B.B.

== See also ==
- List of oil spills
- SS Wafra oil spill – 1971, also sunk by military aircraft.
- Amoco Cadiz oil spill – 1978
- MV Braer – 1993
- MV Sea Empress – 1996
- Lloyd's Open Form
