= Kuwait Technical College =

Educational institute

kuwait technical college
- كلية الكويت التقنية
- Type: Private
- Established: 2014
- Location: Abu Halifa, Al Ahmadi Governorate, Kuwait; 29.1343°N 48.1170°E
- Website: https://www.ktech.edu.kw/
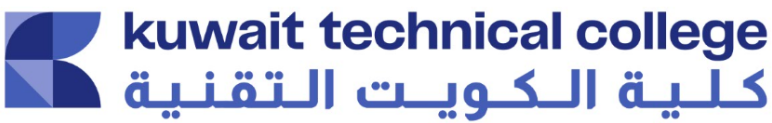

Kuwait Technical College or ktech was founded 2014 to provide opportunities for students who are more oriented toward practical education rather than a more theoretical approach. It is licensed by Kuwait's General Secretariat of Private Universities Council, and offers recognized two-year Diploma and associate degree programs in addition to internationally accredited certificates in Microsoft, CISCO, and CompTIA.

== Academics ==
=== Information Systems and Technology (IT) ===
- Network Systems Administration and Security (Two-year Associate Degree)
- Network Design and Administration (Two-year Associate Degree)
- Software Applications and Programming (Two-year Diploma)
- Web Applications and Programming (Two-year Diploma)

=== Business Management (BM) ===
- E-Commerce (Two-year Associate Degree)
- Management of Information Systems (Two-year Associate Degree)
- Sales and Marketing (Two-year Associate Degree)

== Faculty ==
There are over 100 faculty members & staff at ktech coming from various nationalities.
