= Ichthys gas field =

Natural gas field in Australia

Coordinates: 13°36′S 123°18′E

Ichthys
- Country: Australia
- Region: Timor Sea
- Offshore/onshore: offshore
- Operator: Inpex

Field history
- Discovery: 2000
- Start of production: 2018

Production
- Current production of gas: 10×10^{6} m^{3}/d 350×10^{6} cu ft/d 3.65×10^{9} m^{3}/a (129×10^{9} cu ft/a)
- Estimated oil in place: 70.7 million tonnes (~ 83.8×10^{6} m^{3} or 527 million bbl)
- Estimated gas in place: 366×10^{9} m^{3} 12.8×10^{12} cu ft

The Ichthys gas field is a natural gas field located in the Timor Sea, off the northwestern coast of Australia. The field is located 220 km (140 mi) offshore Western Australia and 820 km (510 mi) southwest of Darwin, with an average water depth of approximately 250 m (820 ft). It was discovered in 2000 and developed by Inpex in partnership with Total, Osaka Gas, JERA (a joint venture of Chubu Electric Power & TEPCO), Toho Gas, Kansai Electric Power and CPC.

First Gas from the Ichthys field was achieved on 30 July 2018. The first condensate cargo was loaded on 1 October 2018, followed by the first LNG cargo on 22 October 2018 with the first LPG cargo planned for later in 2018. Production of LNG will be facilitated through an onshore liquefaction plant located at Bladin Point, near Darwin, which will be connected to the offshore Ichthys field by an 889 km (552 mi) subsea pipeline. The LNG plant has a nominal plant capacity of 8.9 million tonnes per annum (mtpa) which will be achieved through two LNG processing trains.

It is one of the largest LNG giga-projects in the world, with an initial project cost of US$34 billion. However, this cost was subsequently increased to US$37 billion and it is the largest overseas project undertaken by a Japanese company. While the total cost of the Chevron-sponsored Gorgon project is higher, the Ichthys project is more expensive per tonne of production due to the great distance between the offshore field and the onshore terminal. The infrastructure is being constructed by a joint venture between JGC Corporation, KBR and Chiyoda Corporation, with technical contributions by Samsung Heavy Industries, General Electric, McDermott and other contractors.

The total proven reserves of the Ichthys gas field are around 366×10^{9} m^{3} (1.29×10^{13} cu ft), and production is slated to be around 10×10^{6} m^{3}/d (350,000,000 cu ft/d).

The Central Processing Facility (CPF), the Ichthys Explorer, is the world's largest Semi-submersible platform weighing approximately 120,000 t (120,000 long tons) and with topsides measuring approximately 130 m × 120 m (430 ft × 390 ft). The facility was designed to operate continuously for 40 years, and is built to withstand a 1 in 10,000 year event, which required anchor chains with individual links up to 1 m (3.3 ft) in length.

The Floating, Production, Storage and Offloading Vessel (FPSO), the Ichthys Venturer, is 336 m (1,102 ft) long and can hold 178×10^{3} m^{3} (1.12×10^{6} bbl) of crude oil. Like the CPF it is designed to last 40 years, much longer than a typical FPSO, which is vital due to the need to ensure liquids are removed from the gas trunkline to the Bladin point LNG plant. In a first, unlike other FPSOs mooring systems which are designed to allow the FPSO to disconnect, the Ichthys Venturer will be permanently moored on the turret. Most FPSOs disconnect and sail away when a cyclone approaches as their turrets are not designed to cope with the stresses/strains from cyclonic conditions. However, the LNG production as part of the Ichthys development requires the Ichthys Venturer to remain operational.

The strongest cyclone in the region was Cyclone Orson, which recorded wind speeds of 250 km/h (160 mph). The tropical cyclones that the facilities are designed to withstand "swell with periods of 6-18 seconds from any direction and with wave heights of 0.5–9.0 m (1.6–29.5 ft) additionally, "current speeds may reach 1.0 m/s (3.3 ft/s) and occasionally exceed 2.0 m/s (6.6 ft/s) in the near-surface water layer".
