= Al-Nuwaiseeb =

Al-Nuwaiseeb النويصيب
- Location within Kuwait
- Coordinates: 28.574°N 48.375°E
- Country: Kuwait
- District: Ahmadi Governorate

Population
  - Total: 537
- Time zone: UTC+3 (AST)

Al-Nuwaiseeb is a district in the far south of Kuwait. The district itself is located at the southern border with Saudi Arabia, in the Ahmadi Governorate. Al-Nuwaiseeb has a total population of 537. On June 22, 2021, the local weather station recorded 53.2 °C. It was the hottest temperature recorded ever in the Middle East.

Al-Nuwaiseeb borders the Persian Gulf and Saudi Arabia.
