= Wafra =

Wafra الوفرة Al Wafra'h
- Area
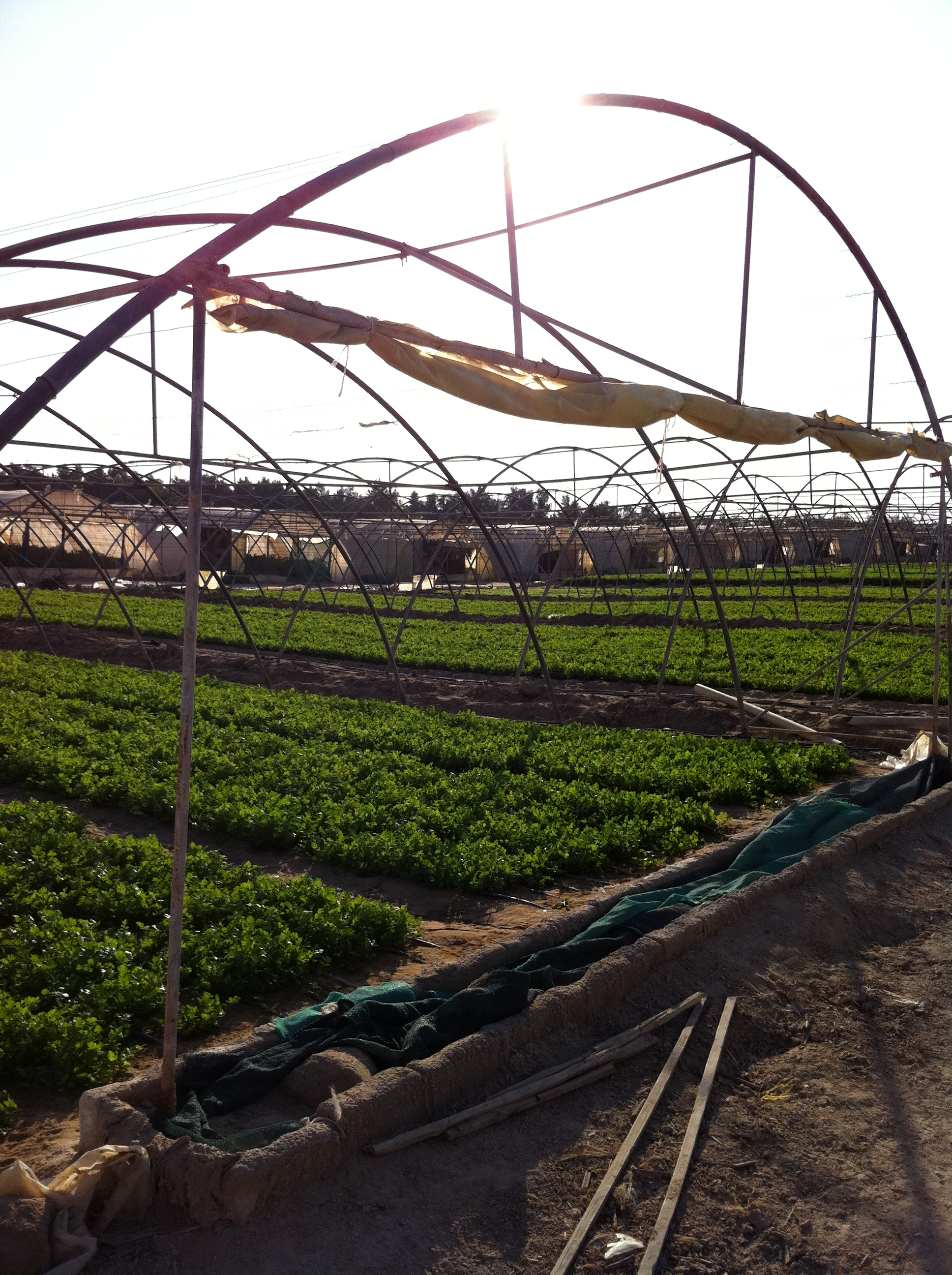
- Vegetable farm in Wafrah

- Location within Kuwait
- Coordinates: 28°33′30″N 48°2′36″E
- Country: Kuwait
- Governorate: Al Ahmadi
- Time zone: UTC+3 (AST)

Wafra (Arabic: الوفرة) is the southernmost area in Kuwait, within the boundaries of the former Saudi–Kuwaiti neutral zone. It is part of Ahmadi Governorate, and is well known for its fertile soil and farms. It is parallel with the Kuwait–Saudi Arabia border. Wafra and Abdali to the north are the only two cities in Kuwait known for farming and livestock. Farms in Wafra are fed by groundwater. The farms have a very original cone-shaped mud dovecotes with hundreds of birds. People tend to visit the Wafra Market to buy fresh vegetables.

== History ==
In ancient times, water was extracted from the depths of its land, making the area reasonably important at the time of the extractions.

The place was first mentioned in a poem by Al-A’sha.

In a volume of "The Geographical Dictionary of the Kingdom of Saudi Arabia – Eastern Region Section (Historically Bahrain)" mentions "Wafra" as being the place where a branch of the Banu Tamim tribe, namely Banu Sa’d bin Zaid Manat bin Tamim, lived.

In the late 1960s and early 1970s, Texaco started to blend in with the locals and inhabit the area, in an optic of profit, after the signing of the Neutral Zone Agreement.

As of today, the Wafra field is operated by the Kuwait Gulf Oil Company, and the Chevron company on behalf of Saudi Arabia.

== Maps and images ==
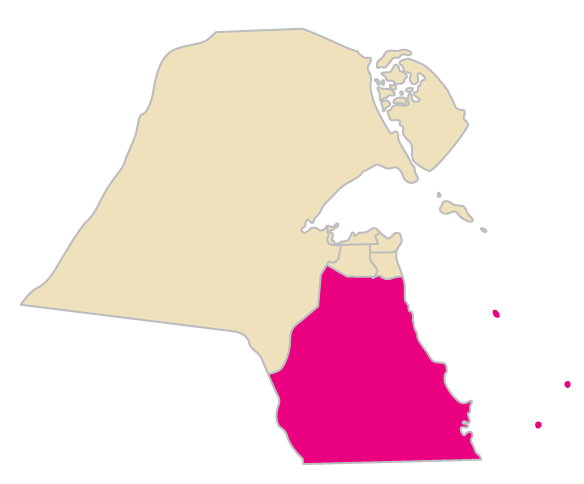
Map of Al Ahmadi Governorate

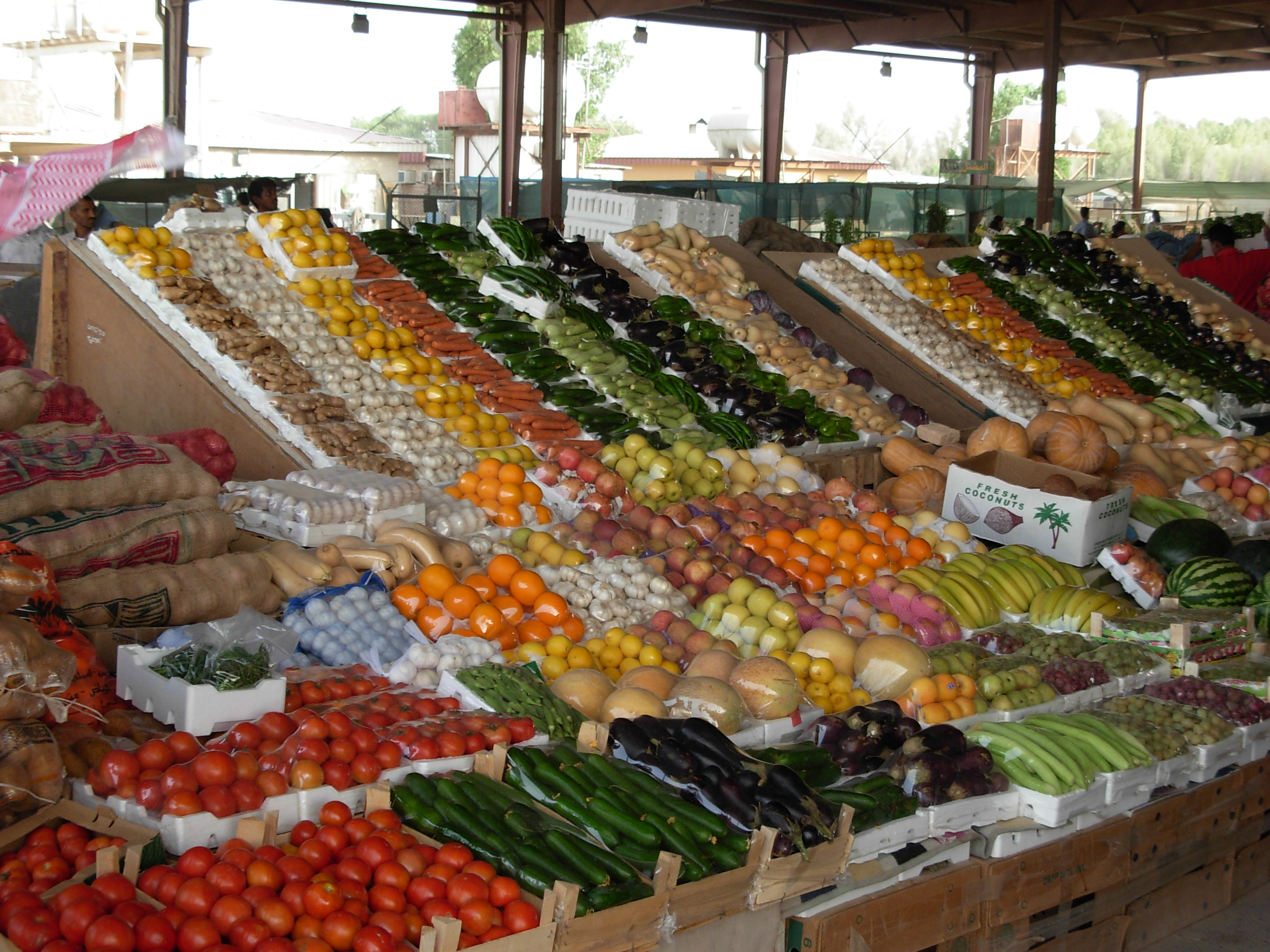
Wafra Market

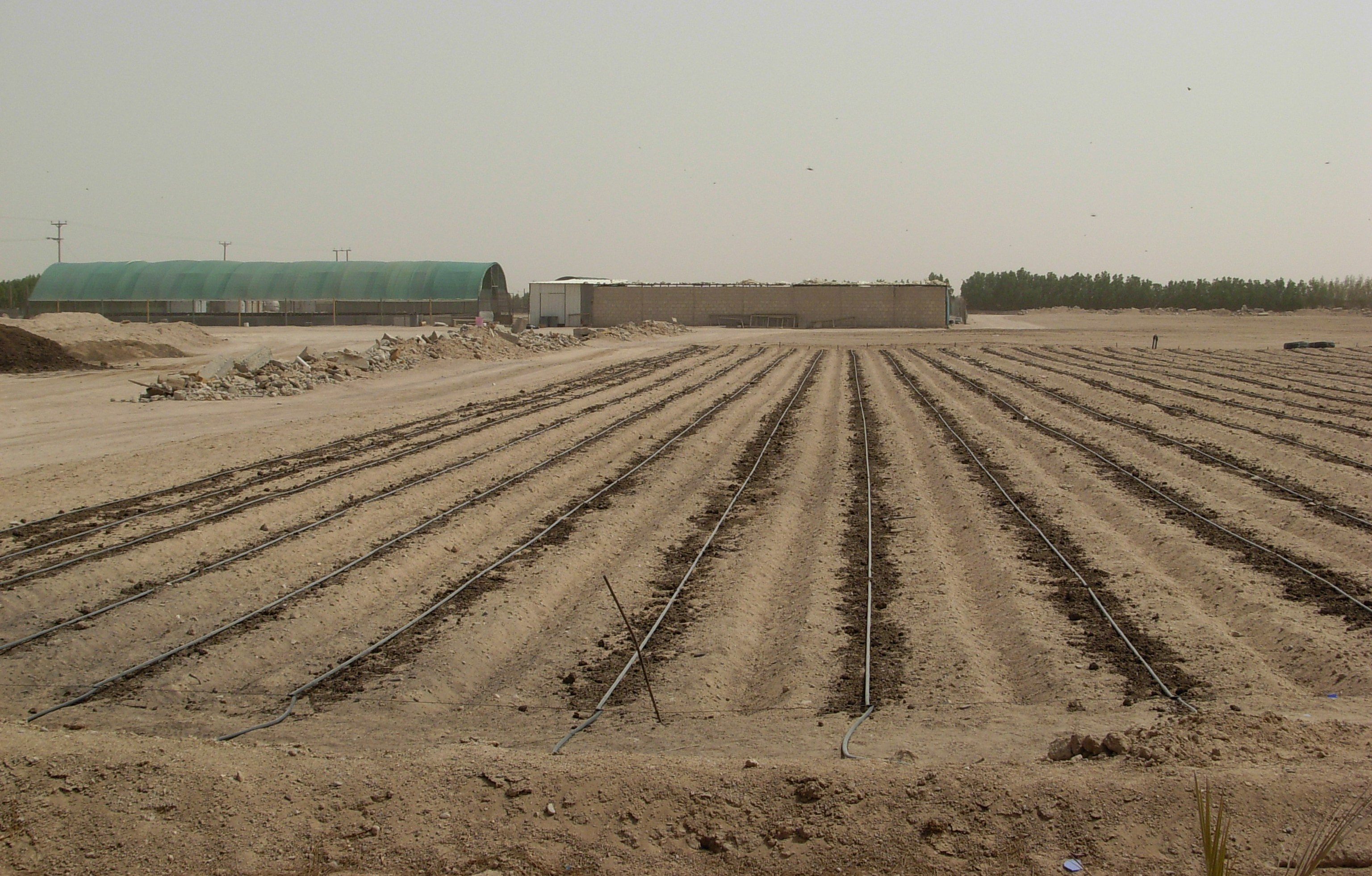
Land prepared for agriculture

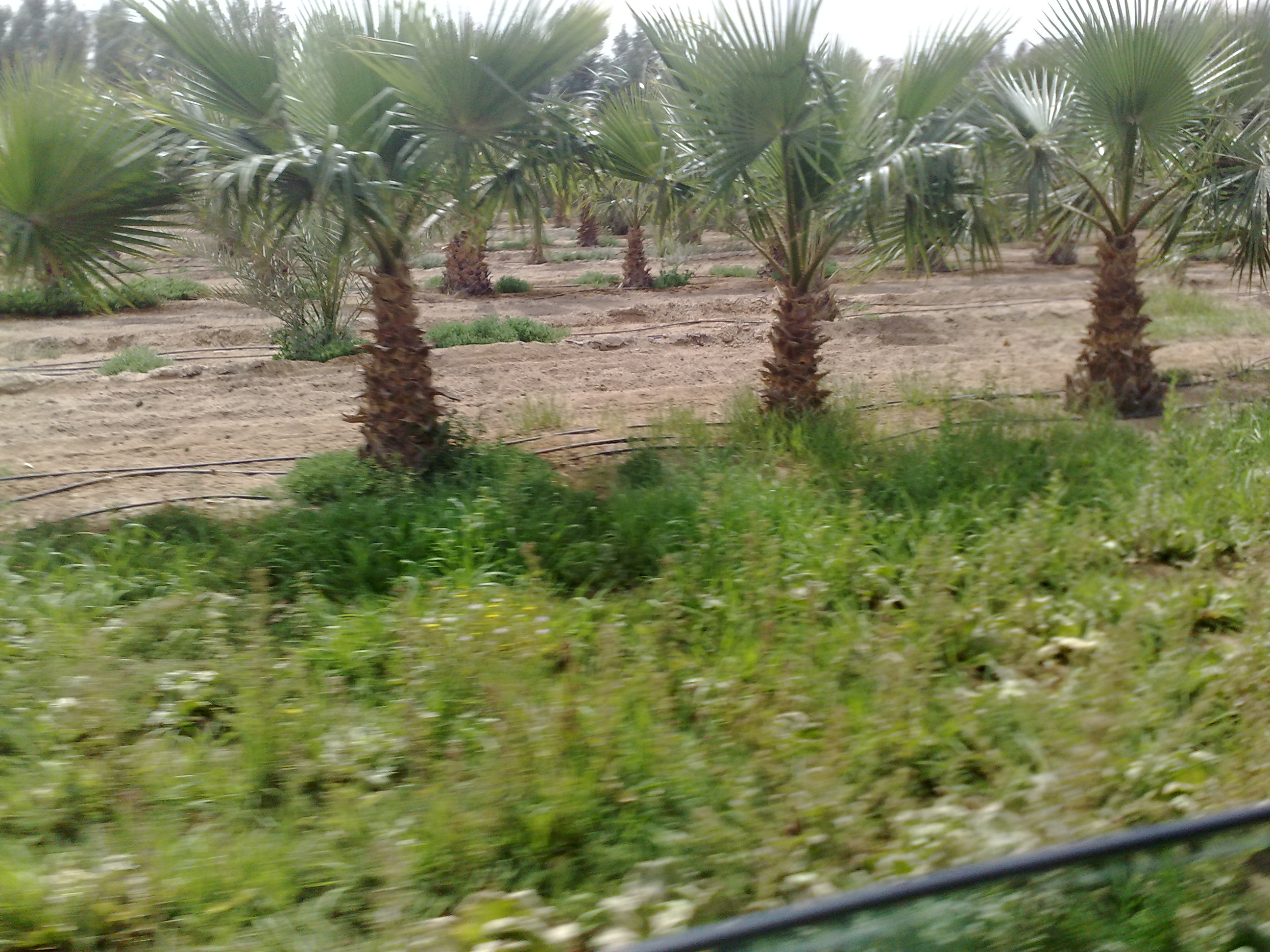
Farm of Washingtonia robusta palm trees
