= SS Torrey Canyon =

Oil tanker wrecked off the coast of Cornwall

History
- Name: SS Torrey Canyon
- Owner: Barracuda Tanker Corporation
- Operator: BP
- Port of registry: Liberia
- Builder: Newport News Shipbuilding
- Yard number: 532
- Launched: 28 October 1958
- Completed: January 1959
- Identification: IMO number: 5365352
- Fate: Sank after running aground on 18 March 1967

General characteristics
- Type: Supertanker
- Tonnage: 61,263 GRT; 118,285 DWT
- Length: 974.4 ft (297.0 m)
- Beam: 125.4 ft (38.2 m)
- Draught: 68.7 ft (20.9 m)
- Propulsion: Single shaft; steam turbine
- Speed: 17 knots (31 km/h; 20 mph)

SS Torrey Canyon was an LR2 (Long Range 2) Suezmax class oil tanker with a cargo capacity of 118,285 long tons (120,183 t) of crude oil. She ran aground off the western coast of Cornwall, United Kingdom, on 18 March 1967, causing an environmental disaster. At that time she was the largest vessel ever to be wrecked. The ship is named after Torrey Canyon, a location in Ventura County, California, USA.

== Design and history ==
When built by Newport News Shipbuilding in the United States in 1959, she had a deadweight tonnage capacity of 65,920 long tons (66,980 t). However, the ship was later enlarged by Sasebo Heavy Industries in Japan to 118,285 long tons (120,183 t) capacity.

At the time of the shipwreck she was owned by Barracuda Tanker Corporation, a subsidiary of the Union Oil Company of California, and registered in Liberia but chartered to BP. She was 974.4 feet (297.0 m) long, 125.4 feet (38.2 m) beam and had 68.7 feet (20.9 m) of draught..

== Accident and oil spill ==
On 19 February 1967, Torrey Canyon left the Kuwait National Petroleum Company's Mina Al-Ahmadi refinery on her final voyage, with a full cargo of crude oil. The ship reached the Canary Islands on 14 March. From there the planned route was to Milford Haven in Wales.

Torrey Canyon struck Pollard's Rock on Seven Stones reef (50°2′N 6°7′W), between the Cornish mainland and the Isles of Scilly, on 18 March. She became grounded and, several days later, began to break up.

In an effort to reduce the size of the oil spill, the British government decided to set the wreck on fire, by means of air strikes from the Fleet Air Arm (FAA) and Royal Air Force (RAF). On 28 March 1967, FAA Blackburn Buccaneers from RNAS Lossiemouth dropped 1,000-pound bombs on the ship. Afterwards RAF Hawker Hunter from RAF Chivenor dropped cans of jet fuel (kerosene), to fuel the blaze. However, the fire was put out by high tides, and further strikes were needed to re-ignite the oil, by FAA de Havilland Sea Vixens from RNAS Yeovilton and Buccaneers from the RNAS Brawdy, as well as Hunters of No 1(F) Squadron RAF from RAF West Raynham with napalm. Bombing continued into the next day, until Torrey Canyon finally sank. A total of 161 bombs, 16 rockets, 1,500 long tons (1,500 t) of napalm and 44,500 litres (9,800 imp gal) of kerosene were used.

Attempts to contain the oil using foam-filled containment booms were largely unsuccessful, due to the booms' fragility in high seas. Soldiers from 9 Independent Parachute Squadron RE were tasked to clear several Cornish beaches affected by the spill.

=== Guernsey ===
When the oil reached Guernsey seven days after the grounding, authorities scooped up the oil into sewage tankers and siphoned it off into a disused quarry in the northeast of the island. Some time later, micro-organisms were introduced to see if they could break the oil down into carbon dioxide and water. This was a limited success, so in 2010, a bio-remediation process was initiated to speed up the process.

== Aftermath ==
An inquiry in Liberia, where the ship was registered, found Shipmaster Pastrengo Rugiati was to blame, because he took a shortcut to save time to get to Milford Haven. Additionally a design fault meant that the helmsman was unaware that the steering selector switch had been accidentally left on autopilot and hence was unable to carry out a timely turn to go through the shipping channel.

The wreck lies at a depth of 30 metres (98 ft).

== In popular culture ==
- Serge Gainsbourg composed and recorded the song "Torrey Canyon" about the incident.
- The UK series Heartbeat ran an episode entitled "The Holiday's Over" in which one of the characters, Vernon Scripps, lost his fortune by becoming a "name" (underwriter) for the Torrey Canyon.
- The podcast Cautionary Tales published their primere episode "Danger Rocks Ahead" about the lessons learned from the disaster.
