= Al Zour Refinery =

Crude oil refinery of Kuwait

- Company type: Government owned
- Industry: Oil refinery
- Founded: 2007 (commissioned 2023)
- Headquarters: Al-Zour, Kuwait
- Products: Petroleum, Petrochemicals
- Owner: Kuwait Integrated Petrochemical Industries Company
- Parent: Kuwait National Petroleum Company

The Al Zour Refinery is an oil refinery in southern Kuwait. It is the second-largest refinery in the Middle East and an essential part of Kuwait Vision 2035. It is Kuwait's largest environmental friendly oil refinery.

Al Zour Refinery is a Kuwait-China cooperation project under the Belt and Road Initiative.

== History ==
The Kuwait National Petroleum Company (KNPC) first released plans to build what would have been the country's fourth oil refinery in May 2006 before construction was postponed in March 2008 due to political opposition. Two years later, however, the government re-approved construction, and the Kuwait Integrated Petroleum Industries Company was created to manage its operations after 2019.

=== Initial plan ===
The Kuwait National Petroleum Company released plans to construct the refinery in July 2007. In May 2008, it awarded construction contracts; the largest contract was granted to a consortium of Japan's JGC Corporation and South Korea's GS Engineering & Construction, covering the installation of six distillation and atmospheric residue desulphurisation units, and diesel, naphtha, and kerosene hydrotreating plants. Korea's SK Engineering & Construction was charged with constructing the hydrogen plants, as well as the compression and sulphur recovery units; Daelim Industrial was to construct storage tanks; and Hyundai Engineering and Construction was to be responsible for the marine works. U.S. engineering and construction firm Fluor Corporation was awarded the offsites and utilities contract. KNPC announced that it would be operational in 2012 and that it planned on spending approximately $14 billion on the project. The refinery is expected to have a capacity of 615,000 bbl/d (97,800 m^{3}/d), which would have made it the largest refinery in the Middle East.

=== Initial cancellation ===
In March 2009, the Kuwaiti government informed the contractors to halt construction, citing a drop in oil prices. Some investment analysts predicted the project's cancellation as early as December 2008. Furthermore, the project encountered political opposition by lawmakers who claimed that the government had not consulted the Central Tenders Committee before awarding contracts to foreign companies.

However, in June 2011, the Supreme Petroleum Council—Kuwait's oil agency—re-approved construction of the refinery in Al Ahmadi, Kuwait. Construction had been halted due to financial concerns and political wrangling, but the Oil Minister affirmed that Kuwait was indeed moving forward with the refinery that would be able to process 615,000 barrels of oil per day. The estimated cost is $14.5 billion, or 4 billion dinars. In May 2012 Kuwait's three existing refineries produced 930,000 barrels per day.

=== Relaunch ===
The Kuwait National Petroleum Company announced that it would relaunch a tender in June 2012. The revised project timeline aims for completion in June 2019. The majority of EPC contracts were issued to Fluor, Daewoo, Hyundai Heavy Industries, Tecnicas Reunidas, Sinopec, Hanwha Engineering and Construction, SK Engineering, Amec (Wood) and Saipem, amongst others. Kuwait Integrated Petroleum Industries Company was created to manage the operations.

Finally, the first phase of Al-Zour integrated refining and petrochemical complex has been commissioned in January 2023. All three phases of the refinery are commissioned successfully.

== See also ==
- Kuwait Vision 2035
