= Sevenstones Lightship =

Lightship in UK

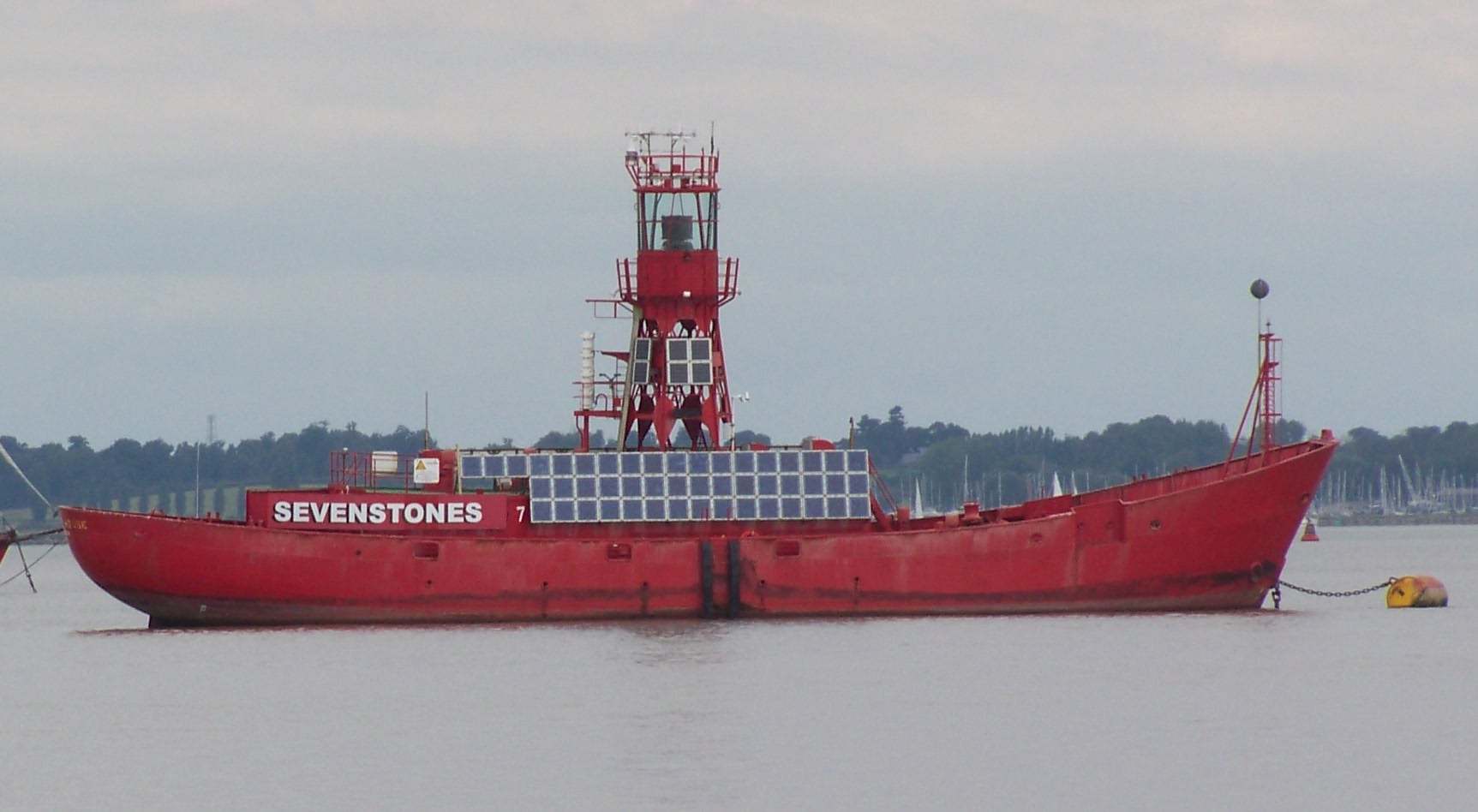
- Sevenstones Lightship, LV 7, decommissioned 2008

History

United Kingdom
- Operator: Trinity House

General characteristics
- Type: Lightvessel

Sevenstones
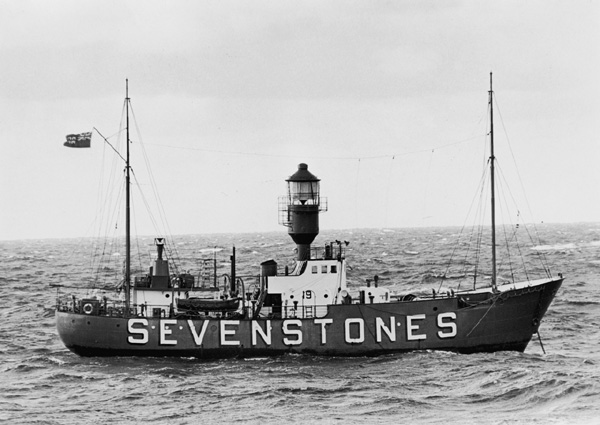
- Coordinates: 50°03′37″N 6°04′20″W
- Operator: Trinity House
- Racon: O

Light
- Focal height: 12 m (39 ft)
- Range: 15 nmi (28 km; 17 mi)
- Characteristic: Fl(3) W 30s

Sevenstones Lightship is a lightvessel station off the Seven Stones Reef which is nearly 15 miles (24 km) to the west-north-west (WNW) of Land's End, Cornwall, and 7 miles (11 km) east-north-east (ENE) of the Isles of Scilly. The reef has been a navigational hazard to shipping for centuries with seventy-one named wrecks and an estimated two hundred shipwrecks overall, the most infamous being the oil tanker Torrey Canyon on 18 March 1967. The rocks are only exposed at half tide. Since it was not feasible to build a lighthouse, a lightvessel was provided by Trinity House. The first was moored near the reef on 20 August 1841 and exhibited its first light on 1 September 1841. She is permanently anchored in 40 fathoms (73 m) and is 2.5 miles (4.0 km) north-east (NE) of the reef. Since 1987, the Sevenstones Lightship has been automated and unmanned.

The Seven Stones lightvessel also acts as an automatic weather station. A series of Trinity House lightships stationed near the Sevenstones Reef have measured significant wave heights (Hs or SWH)—the periodic average of the highest one third of waves in a spectrum—since the early 1960s using Ship Borne Wave Recorders (SBWR). The Sevenstones Lightship is in a very exposed location and is open to most North Atlantic storms.

== First lightvessel ==
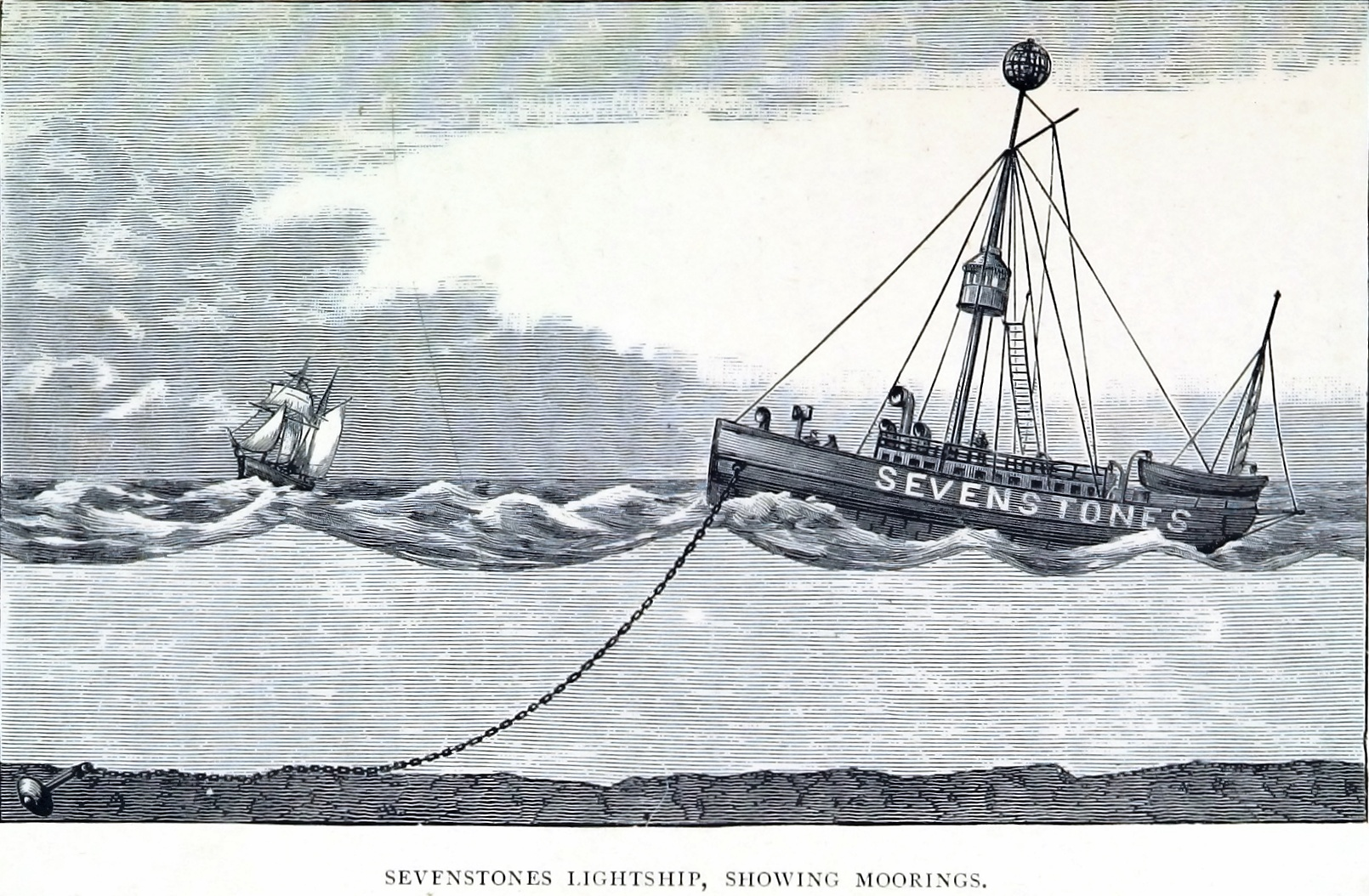
Sevenstones Lightship, showing moorings

As early as 1826 the government was petitioned to build a light on the reef and a second petition in 1839, supported by the Chamber of Commerce of Waterford, merchants from Liverpool and the Bristol Channel ports resulted in a meeting being held in Falmouth on 21 February 1840. It was declared that a light on or near the reef would shorten the passage around Scilly by up to thirty-six hours. As a result, the first lightship was moored, in 40 fathoms (240 ft; 73 m) on a slate and sand bottom, near the reef on 20 August 1841 and shone its first light on 1 September 1841. Originally there was a crew of ten with five on station at a time. A few months after being placed in position she drifted from her anchorage and was consequently provided with a new "mushroom" anchor which was better suited to lightships. The West Briton of 25 November 1842 reported that her cable parted and she almost became a wreck when she drove over the reef at high tide. The crew steered the ship to New Grimsby, Tresco, from where she was towed back, and on 6 January 1843 she broke adrift again. The following March, she was found drifting in a moderate southwest breeze, and was again towed to New Grimsby. She was towed back to her position on 10 April, and anchored in 42 fathoms (252 ft; 77 m).

Relief occurred monthly with the master or mate and twelve men always on board, with the other officer and three men on shore in rotation. Houses were provided on Tresco for the crew and provisions were procured by crew members rowing and sailing to New Grimsby in the vessel's longboat. Two of the crew drowned on 15 October 1851 when one of the lightship's longboats capsized in a squall, while on a journey from Scilly with stores. Following a dispute with Augustus Smith, the governor of the Isles of Scilly, accommodation and provisions were provided from Penzance. The crew would have had a fright when a meteor exploded over the lightvessel, at 2 am on 13 November 1872, showering the deck with cinders. On 30 January 1873 the London barque Athole came too close and caught her rigging on the lightship's bumpkin carrying away her main and mizzen halyards, and the starboard light.

=== Design ===
Built by William Pitcher of Thames Ironworks and Shipbuilding Company, Blackwall, the cost of the hull came to £3,128 8s and the fully equipped vessel £4,416 8s 7d. Built of wood, with a tonnage of 162, her length was 80 ft (24 m), breadth 21 ft (6 m) and her two masts for the lights were 69 ft (21 m) and 60 ft (18 m) tall. She carried one lug sail, a staysail and a jib. Red balls were fixed on each mast to distinguish her from other lightvessels. The two lights were displayed at 38 ft (12 m) and 20 ft (6 m), were of the catoptric system and could be seen from 10 miles (16 km) away. She also carried a gong fog signal.

Trevose Head Lighthouse, on the north Cornish coast, also had two lights and the Sevenstones light was reduced to one, to stop confusion between the two. The single light was originally intended to be installed in 1878 but was postponed to May 1879 By 1891 only one white light was displayed at 38 ft (12 m) with three quick flashes followed by thirty-six seconds of darkness. In stormy weather or in fog it was difficult for mariners to tell where they were and similar lights added to the confusion.

== Temporary lightvessel ==
On Saturday 3 May 1879 a temporary lightvessel was towed to the Sevenstones from Milford by the new Trinity House yacht Siren and the old vessel towed to London.

== Second lightvessel (No 50) ==
The temporary lightvessel was removed on 18 September 1879 and towed to Milford by Vestal. The new light was successfully moored the same day, with the latest in fog-warning machinery and a revolving light, instead of the two fixed lights on the old vessel. Number 50 was removed to London in 1883 for repair and a thorough overhaul and was replaced by lightship number 35.

== Third lightvessel ==
Lightvessel 80 took up her position during the Second World War and was replaced with a lighted buoy after being frequently bombed and strafed by the Luftwaffe. She broke adrift in March 1948 and her engine failed in November 1950. She was replaced in 1958 by lightvessel 19. Lightvessel 80's last known sighting was in a Sotheby's catalogue for sale at £85,000.

=== Design ===
Lightvessel 80 was built by H & C Grayson, of Liverpool in 1914. She was 116 ft (35 m) long, had a breadth of 26 ft (8 m) and was 318 tons. In 1954 she undertook a refit with the provision of hot water, electric lighting, refrigerator, one and two-berth cabins and a roomy mess deck. Daily work on the ship such as watch-keeping and maintenance of the 600,000 candle power lantern could be carried out without going outside. Before, the refit crew had to climb up the mast every morning to trim the lamps, hauling their supply of oil with them; a dangerous task in rough weather.

== Fourth lightvessel ==
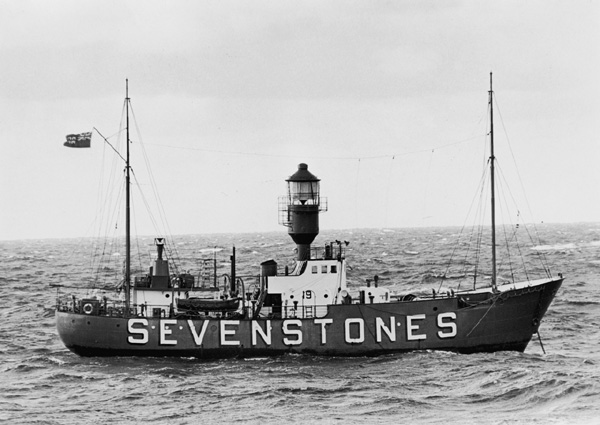
Sevenstones Light Vessel, LV 19

Lightvessel 19 was in position in 1958 and was on station when Torrey Canyon became, at that time, the largest shipwreck in world history. The lightship was towed to Penzance for a few days while the wreck was bombed by Fleet Air Arm aircraft; in an attempt to release the remaining oil on board and set fire to it.

=== Design ===
Lightvessel 19 was built by Philip and Son of Dartmouth and launched on 30 May 1958 and the Sevenstones was her first station. She is 133 ft (41 m) long and 26 ft (8 m) wide, a gross tonnage of 390 and cost £118,854. She had the same 600,000 candle power as the previous ship and shone a group of three white flashes every thirty seconds, visible in good conditions to 11 miles (18 km).

== Fifth lightvessel ==
Lightvessel 22 was built by Richards (Shipbuilders) Ltd of Lowestoft in 1967 with a displacement of 390 tons. Her length is 114 ft (35 m) and breadth 26.5 ft (8 m) and she was on station from 1998 to 2001. LV22 was back on station in 2021

== Sixth lightvessel ==
Lightvessel 2 was in position in October 2004.

== Automated weather station ==
The lightship serves as an automated weather station for the UK Met Office and is owned and maintained by Trinity House. On-board equipment measures wind speed and direction, current atmospheric pressure and its tendency, air temperature, dew point and water temperature. The lightship also carries a Ship-Borne Wave Recorder which measures significant wave height, abbreviated H_{s}, and the corresponding average wave period, abbreviated AWP or T_{s}. H_{s} is the average height of the highest third of all waves occurring during the measurement time interval. T_{s} or AWP meanwhile is the average period, in seconds, of the entire measured spectrum of waves recorded by the lightship's SBWR: This figure is attained by measuring shorter period surface wind chop (typically 1-6 seconds), developed mid range waves (7-12 seconds) and longer underlying ocean groundswells (13 seconds plus) - all of which, or some of which may be present in the collected dataset, and then averaging them all out as a single representative AWP figure to give mariners a general guide. All of these data are updated hourly, on the hour.

== Wave activity recorded at the Sevenstones Lightship ==
The largest waves tend to occur when there is a large westerly or west northwesterly Atlantic fetch.

The Sevenstones lightvessel does not report individual wave heights; she reports only the significant wave height H_{s}. This measurement gives mariners a general indication of the sea state in this notoriously hazardous shipping area. However, it is worth noting that maximum wave heights in any sea state frequently exceed H_{s}. The Rayleigh distribution shows statistically that if H_{s} is, for example, 10 meter (33 ft), then one wave in 100 will be larger than 15 meter (50 ft). This relationship is frequently confirmed by eyewitness accounts.

In 1989 the Institute of Oceanographic Sciences' Deacon Laboratory published a report on wave measurements at the station from 1962 to 1988. It revealed a high-energy wave environment at the Sevenstones Reef, with an H_{s} of over 11.15 metres (36.6 ft) recorded on 17 October 1982, and 10.99 metres (36.1 ft) recorded on 16 January 1974.

In February 2014, H_{s} values of 10.6 metres (35 ft) were recorded on 1 February at 15.00 GMT, and 10.4 metres (34 ft) on 8 February at 10.00 GMT.

More recently, on 8 February 2016 at 10.00 GMT, an H_{s} of 11.73 metres (38.5 ft) was recorded at the station. This activity resulted from the Atlantic storm Imogen. BBC News, citing the UK Met Office, reported that maximum wave heights off the Cornish Coast on this day were recorded at 63 ft (19.1m) at the nearby Wave Hub Buoy stationed at 50° 20.833'N 005° 36.853'W. Based on its closeness, the direction of the waves and the similarity of the H_{s} values, the Sevenstones Lightship would most likely have encountered similar maximum wave heights.

Generally, wave patterns in this area are believed to correlate with the North Atlantic Oscillation Index.

== Temporary lightvessels ==
- August 1967 to December 1967: Lightvessel 1 (Mary Mouse 2)
- 1978 Light Vessel 95.
- October 2003: Lightvessel 21 situated on the Seven Stones Reef

== See also ==
- Trinity House
- Seven Stones Reef
- List of shipwrecks of the Seven Stones Reef
