= Al-Zour =

Coordinates: 28.712924°N 48.330014°E

Al-Zour (Arabic: الزور) is an area in Kuwait. It is located in the southern part of the country near Wafra. The Al Zour Refinery, the second-largest refinery in the Middle East, is located in the area.

== See also ==
- Kuwait's Fifth District
