= Sulina, Paraná =

Sulina
- Municipality
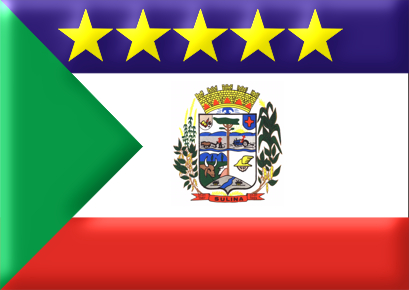
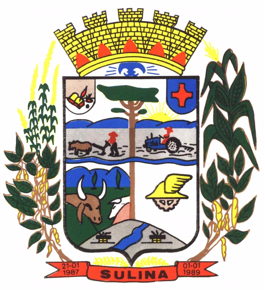
- Flag Coat of arms

- Municipal location within the State of Paraná

- Location in Brazil
- Coordinates: 25.70194°S 52.72222°W
- Country: Brazil
- State: Paraná
- Municipality: Sulina

Government
  - Mayor: Paulo Horn

Area
  - Total: 170.759 km^{2} (65.930 sq mi)
- Elevation: 497 m (1,631 ft)

Population (2020)
  - Total: 2,930
  - Density: 17.2/km^{2} (44.4/sq mi)
- Demonym: sulinense
- Time zone: UTC−3 (BRT)

Sulina is a municipality in the Brazilian state of Paraná. It has an area of 170.759 square kilometres (65.930 sq mi). It has a humid subtropical climate. As of 2020 the estimated population was 2,930.

== Geography ==
Sulina is in the state of Paraná, Brazil. It has an area of 170.759 square kilometres (65.930 sq mi) as of 2019. The elevation above sea level is about 497 metres (1,631 ft).

=== Climate ===
The Köppen climate type is Cfa : humid subtropical climate. The average annual temperature is 20 °C (68 °F). The average annual rainfall is 2,634 millimetres (103.7 in).

Sulina, Paraná

Climate chart (precipitation, max. and min. temperature)
J	F	M	A	M	J	J	A	S	O	N	D
199 27 18	268 27 18	197 27 19	214 25 16	205 19 12	500 18 11	125 19 12	57 23 12	242 25 13	188 28 15	173 29 16	263 30 17
- █ Average max. and min. temperatures in °C
- █ Precipitation totals in mm
Imperial conversion
J	F	M	A	M	J	J	A	S	O	N	D
7.8 81 64	11 81 64	7.8 81 66	8.4 77 61	8.1 66 54	20 64 52	4.9 66 54	2.2 73 54	9.5 77 55	7.4 82 59	6.8 84 61	10 86 63
- █ Average max. and min. temperatures in °F
- █ Precipitation totals in inches

== Demographics ==
The population in the 2010 census was 3,314. The estimated population as of 2019 was 2,981. Population density as of 2010 was 19.88 inhabitants per square kilometre (51.5/sq mi). As of 2010, 99.2% of the population had attended school between the ages of 6 and 14. Also as of 2010, the municipal Human Development Index was 0.693. This compares to 0.397 in 1991 and 0.614 in 2000.

On the 2010 census religion was reported as Catholic by 2979 people, Evangelical by 395 people and Animism by 0 people.

In 2017, the average monthly salary of formal workers was 2.3 minimum wages. Formally employed people were 12.8% of the total population. Households with monthly income of up to half a minimum wage per person represent 29.9% of the population. Estimates of GDP per capita:

== Health and sanitation ==
2.8% of households have adequate sanitation, 74.2% of urban households are on public roads with afforestation and 16.4% of urban households are on public roads with adequate urbanization (presence of manhole, sidewalk, pavement and curb). Annual hospitalizations due to diarrhea are 2.8 per 1,000 inhabitants. Deaths per 1,000 live births:

== Municipal finances ==
Committed municipal expenditure by year:

Realized municipal revenue by year:

== See also ==
- List of municipalities in Paraná

== Sources ==
- Brasil / / Sulina, IBGE
- "Sulina", Geonames
- Sulina, Brazilian Institute of Geography and Statistics
- "Sulina, Brazil", Mindat
- NASA Earth Observations Data Set Index, NASA
- NASA Earth Observations: Rainfall (1 month - TRMM), NASA/Tropical Rainfall Monitoring Mission
