= Wiseman Magwa =

Zimbabwean playwright and educator (born 1962)

Wiseman Magwa (born 1962) is a Zimbabwean playwright and educator.

== Biography ==
Magwa is a lecturer at Gweru Teacher's College. He is one of very few Shona writers using oral performances and texts to educate communities on social issues including nationalism, promiscuity and AIDS. He works with fellow playwright Willie Chigidie, with the Midlands Drama Association for Schools and Colleges.

== Bibliography ==
- 1990: Mafaro (Carnal Pleasure)
  - "Nhumbu Ndeyenyu" ("You are Responsible for the Pregnancy")
  - "Tawanda Mwana'ngu" ("Tawanda, My Son")
- 1991: Atsunzunya Rega Atsikwe (One who Closes One's Eyes should be Left to be Trampled) — with Willie Chigidie
- 1991: Njuzu (Water Spirits or Mermaid)
- 1997: The Careers of Women Teachers Under Apartheid — with Shirley Motleke Mahlase
