= Kuwait Girl Guides Association =

National Guiding organization of Kuwait

- Kuwait Girl Guides Association
- Country: Kuwait
- Founded: 1957
- Membership: 9,715
- Affiliation: World Association of Girl Guides and Girl Scouts

The Kuwait Girl Guides Association (Arabic: الإتحاد الكويتي للفتيات المرشدات) (KGGA) is the national Guiding organization of Kuwait. The association has 9,715 members (as of 2003). Founded in 1957, the girls-only organization became a full member of the World Association of Girl Guides and Girl Scouts (WAGGGS) in 1966.

== Program and ideals ==
Girls are organised into groups by age, as in other Guiding and Scouting organisations. Brownies are between age 7 and 11. Girl Guides are between age 12 and 16. Senior Girl Guides are between age 17 and 23.

The Girl Guide emblem incorporates elements of the coat of arms of Kuwait.

== Promise and Law ==
The Brownie promise is:

I promise to do my best in carrying out my duty towards God and my country, and in helping people under all circumstances, especially those at home.

The Brownie law is:

The Brownie must obey those who are older, must be resolute, must not yield to her whims, must take the Brownie Promise.

The Girl Guide promise is:

I promise upon my honour to do my best,
in doing my duty towards God and my country;
in helping people under all circumstances;
in following the Law of the Girl Guides.

The Girl Guide law is:

1. The honour of the Girl Guides is faith and confidence.
2. The Girl Guide is sincere towards her country, her parents, her seniors and her juniors.
3. The Girl Guide should be useful to herself and to others.
4. The Girl Guide is the friend to all and sister to every other Girl Guide.
5. The Girl Guide is of good character.
6. The Girl Guide is kind to animals.
7. The Girl Guide sincerely obeys her parents, the head of her division and the leaders of her group.
8. The Girl Guide smiles in the face of trouble and faces it with patience and steadfastness.
9. The Girl Guide is thrifty.
10. The Girl Guide is pure-hearted, decent in word and generous in deed.

== See also ==
- Kuwait Boy Scouts Association
