= Aminoil =

The American Independent Oil Company, commonly known as Aminoil, was a United States oil exploration and production company, incorporated in 1947.

== Beginning in 1948 ==
Aminoil was a consortium of independent companies, including Phillips, Signal, Ashland, and Sinclair, put together by Ralph K. Davies to bid on the Kuwait Neutral Zone concession.

Aminoil's major interest was in Kuwait, which in 1948 granted the company a 60-year concession to explore for and extract oil and natural gas in the Kuwait “Neutral Zone”, with the agreement of the British authorities and neighbouring Saudi Arabia.

Aminoil's commercial production and exportation of petroleum products began in 1954, but it suffered from low-grade reserves and was never more than a minor player in the country, barely achieving 2.5 percent of total Kuwait output.

== Refinery ==
From 1958 the company operated a refinery at Mina Abdullah, until 1975 when it passed to the Kuwait state, and ultimately to the Kuwait National Petroleum Company.

== 1960s ==
Through the 1960s, the business faced difficulties and delivered poor returns. In 1970 it was bought by R. J. Reynolds Industries Inc for $56 million, bringing much new investment as the new parent company sought to strengthen Aminoil's competitive position, and be a stable source of fuel for its growing but troubled container shipping business, Sea-Land Industries.

== Post-war ==
As the post-war situation in the region made way for the emergence of the modern state of Kuwait, Aminoil and the Kuwait government engaged in protracted discussions over new arrangements, amid strong differences of opinion. An agreement in 1973 set out wide-ranging changes in the relationship, including bringing the company under the 1971 Tehran Agreement and an increase in the applicable tax rate from 57 percent to 80 percent.

In 1982 a legal case, Government of Kuwait v. The American Independent Oil Company (AMINOIL), resolved outstanding issues.

== Sale ==
In September 1984, RJ Reynolds sold Aminoil to Phillips Petroleum for $1.7 billion. At the time, Aminoil was the United States' second-largest independent petroleum exploration and production company with operations in California, Argentina, the North Sea and Indonesia.

== See also ==
- Kuwait Oil Company
