= JGC Holdings Corporation =

Japanese company

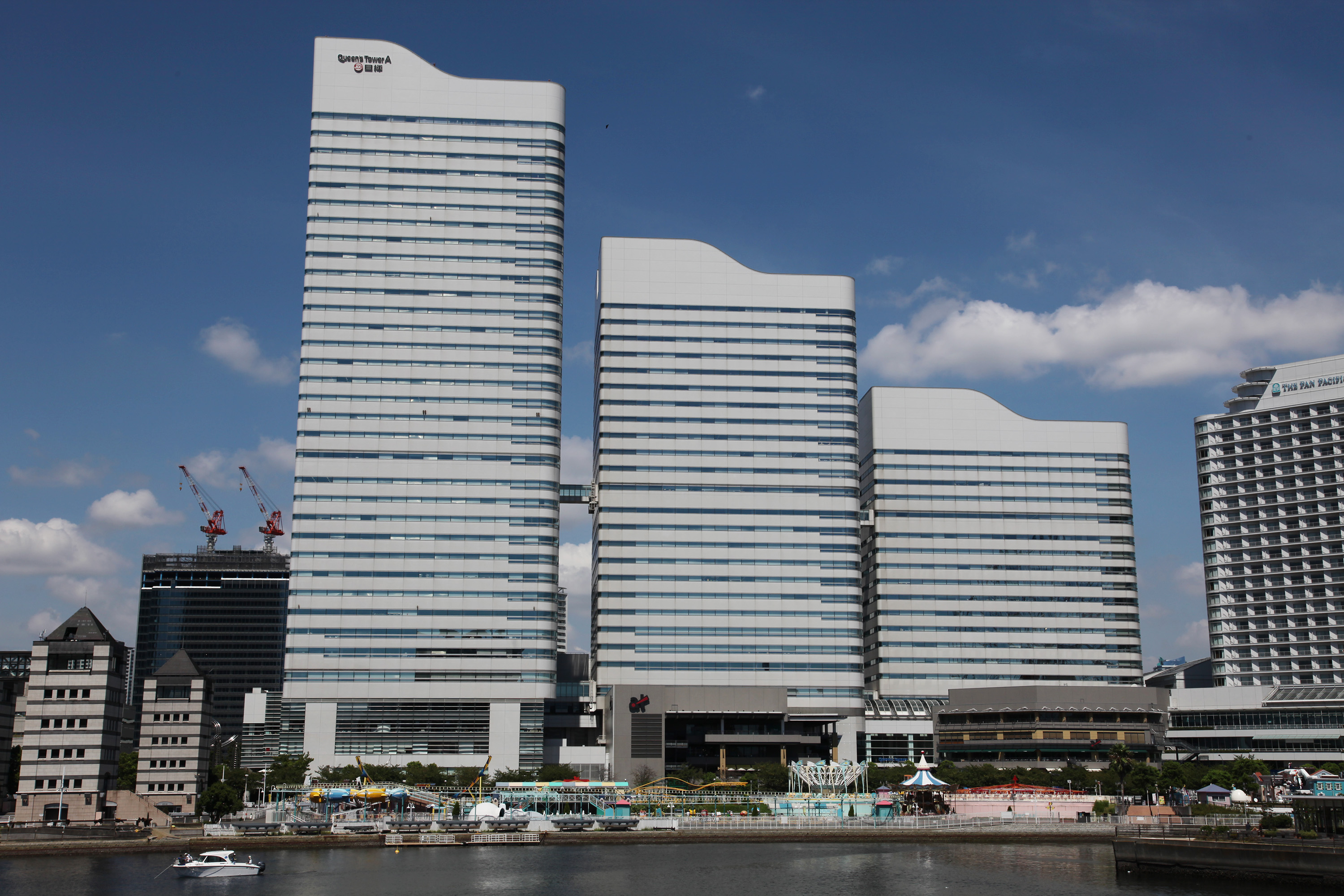
- Headquarters in Nishi-ku, Yokohama
- Native name: 日揮ホールディングス株式会社
- Romanized name: Nikki Hōrudingusu Kabushiki-gaisha
- Formerly: Japan Gasoline Co., Ltd. (1928-1976); JGC Corporation (1976-2019)
- Type: Public
- Traded as: TYO: 1963; TOPIX 100 Component; Nikkei 225 Component
- ISIN: JP3667600005
- Industry: Engineering; Construction services
- Founded: October 25, 1928; 97 years ago
- Founder: Masao Saneyoshi
- Headquarters: Minato Mirai, Nishi-ku, Yokohama 220-6001, Japan
- Key people: Masayuki Sato (chairman of the board and CEO); Tadashi Ishizuka (president and COO)
- Revenue: ▲JPY 879.9 billion (FY 2015) (US$ 7.3 billion) (FY 2015)
- Net income: ▲JPY 42.7 billion (FY 2015) (US$ 356 million) (FY 2015)
- Number of employees: 7,554 (consolidated, as of March 31, 2017)
- Website: jgc.com

JGC Holdings Corporation (日揮ホールディングス株式会社, Nikki Hōrudingusu Kabushiki-gaisha), formerly JGC Corporation (日揮株式会社, Nikki Kabushiki-gaisha), and before that Japan Gasoline Co. (日本揮発油株式会社, Nihon kihatsuyu kabushiki gaisha), is a global engineering company headquartered in Yokohama, Japan.

The company was founded on 25 October 1928. In 1976, it changed its original name from Japan Gasoline Co. to JGC Corp. In 2019, it changed its name to JGC Holdings Corporation to reflect its changed corporate structure. JGC participates in the design and construction of large energy projects, such as Al Zour Refinery, Nigeria LNG, Pearl GTL, Ichthys LNG, Gorgon LNG, Tangguh LNG and Dolphin Gas Project and over the course of the company's history it implemented over 20,000 projects in 50 countries.

The company is listed on the first section of Tokyo Stock Exchange and is a constituent of the TOPIX 100 and Nikkei 225 stock market indices.

== Overview ==
The company is a leading engineering company in Japan. Their main business is "building manufacturing facilities to make products." These manufacturing facilities include oil refineries, petrochemical and chemical plants, LNG plants, and natural gas processing plants.

Since its establishment, the company has carried out over 20,000 projects in more than 80 countries worldwide, boasting one of the most remarkable track records in the world. Especially in the area of LNG plants, they have designed and built plants that account for more than 30% of the world's production volume. During the plant construction boom in the late 2000s due to high crude oil prices, they adopted a selective order strategy, reducing sales while achieving record-high profits.

In recent years, they have been exploring and expanding into new areas such as waste plastic gasification facilities, SAF production facilities, and lunar propellant plants. This indicates a move away from their traditional reliance solely on oil & gas operations.

While the scale of their business in this sector isn't massive, they also have a track record in the life sciences field related to medicine and pharmaceuticals. In 2008, they won a contract for the facility maintenance, operation, and procurement of Tokyo's Mental Health Center for about 15 years. This marked the first hospital PFI business for a domestic engineering company in Japan. Moreover, they are earnestly embarking on environmental businesses, including carbon credit trading, and participation in water quality improvement projects in China has been reported. In North America, they have started an oil development business as a 100% owned operator (producing about 1,000 barrels per day), indicating a notable expansion beyond plants.

Domestically in Japan, the company, along with Toyo Engineering and Chiyoda Chemical Construction, was once called the "Big Three of Engineering." However, as of 2020, the company significantly outpaces the other two in terms of net profit and order backlog.

Every month, on the last day, they advertise prominently on the front page of the morning edition of the Nihon Keizai Shimbun newspaper.
