= Kuwait Boy Scouts Association =

National Scouting organization of Kuwait

- جمعية الكشافة الكويتية
- Country: Kuwait
- Founded: 1952
- Membership: 6,061
- Affiliation: World Organization of the Scout Movement
- Website scout-kuwait.com

The Kuwait Boy Scouts Association (KBSA, Arabic: جمعية الكشافة الكويتية) is the national Scouting organization of Kuwait. Scouting in Kuwait started in 1935, the KBSA was founded in 1952 and became a member of the World Organization of the Scout Movement in 1955. It has 6,061 members (as of 2008).

In 1981, Hassan Al-Ali was awarded the Bronze Wolf, the only distinction of the World Organization of the Scout Movement, awarded by the World Scout Committee for exceptional services to world Scouting.

Kuwait Scouting features out-of-school education in character development, skills and traditions and clean living.

Community service projects include participation in environmental services, World Health Day and conducting youth work camps. Scouts also assist several charitable organizations in co-operative activities.

The Scouts have also offered considerable aid and assistance to other Scout organizations in the Persian Gulf area.

The Scout Motto is Kun Musta'idan or كن مستعداً, translating as Be Prepared in Arabic. The noun for a single Scout is Kashaf or كشاف in Arabic.

The membership badge of the Kuwait Boy Scouts Association incorporates elements of the coat of arms of Kuwait in a seashell pattern.

== Scout Oath ==
I promise to do my best, to do what I have to do towards Allah, then my country, then my Amir. And to help people in all circumstances and to obey the Scout Law.

== See also ==
- Kuwait Girl Guides Association
