= Mina Abdullah Refinery =

Oil refinery in Kuwait

- Location: Mina Abdullah, Kuwait

Refinery details
- Operator: Kuwait National Petroleum Company (KNPC)
- Owner: Kuwait National Petroleum Company
- Opened: 1978
- Area: 7.84 km^{2} (3.03 sq mi)
- Capacity: 490,000 barrels per day (78,000 m^{3}/d)

Mina Abdullah Refinery (MAB) is an oil refinery in Mina Abdullah, Kuwait that is operated by the Kuwait National Petroleum Company (KNPC), a subsidiary of Kuwait Petroleum Corporation (KPC).

== History ==
Mina Abdullah Refinery was established in 1958 by the American Independent Oil Company (AMINOIL) with an initial capacity of 30,000 barrels per day. Its ownership was then transferred to the KNPC in 1978. The refinery underwent technological modernization in 1988 under the following year's Modernization Project (MAB RMP), which introduced new technologies to manufacture low-sulfur products. The refinery received the Middle East Best refinery award during a conference organized by the World Refining Association in 2005, and by 2011, it received the Royal Society for Prevention of Accidents (RoSPA) award. The refinery was further modernized in 2022 under the Clean Fuels Project (CFP) with the goal of producing more high-quality, eco-friendly petroleum products that meets Euro-5 standards.

The refinery became the subject of drone attacks on March 2026 as apart of the 2026 Iran War, resulting in a fire.
