= Seven Stones Reef =

Rocky reef offshore of Land's End, Cornwall

Coordinates: 50°03′N 6°04′W

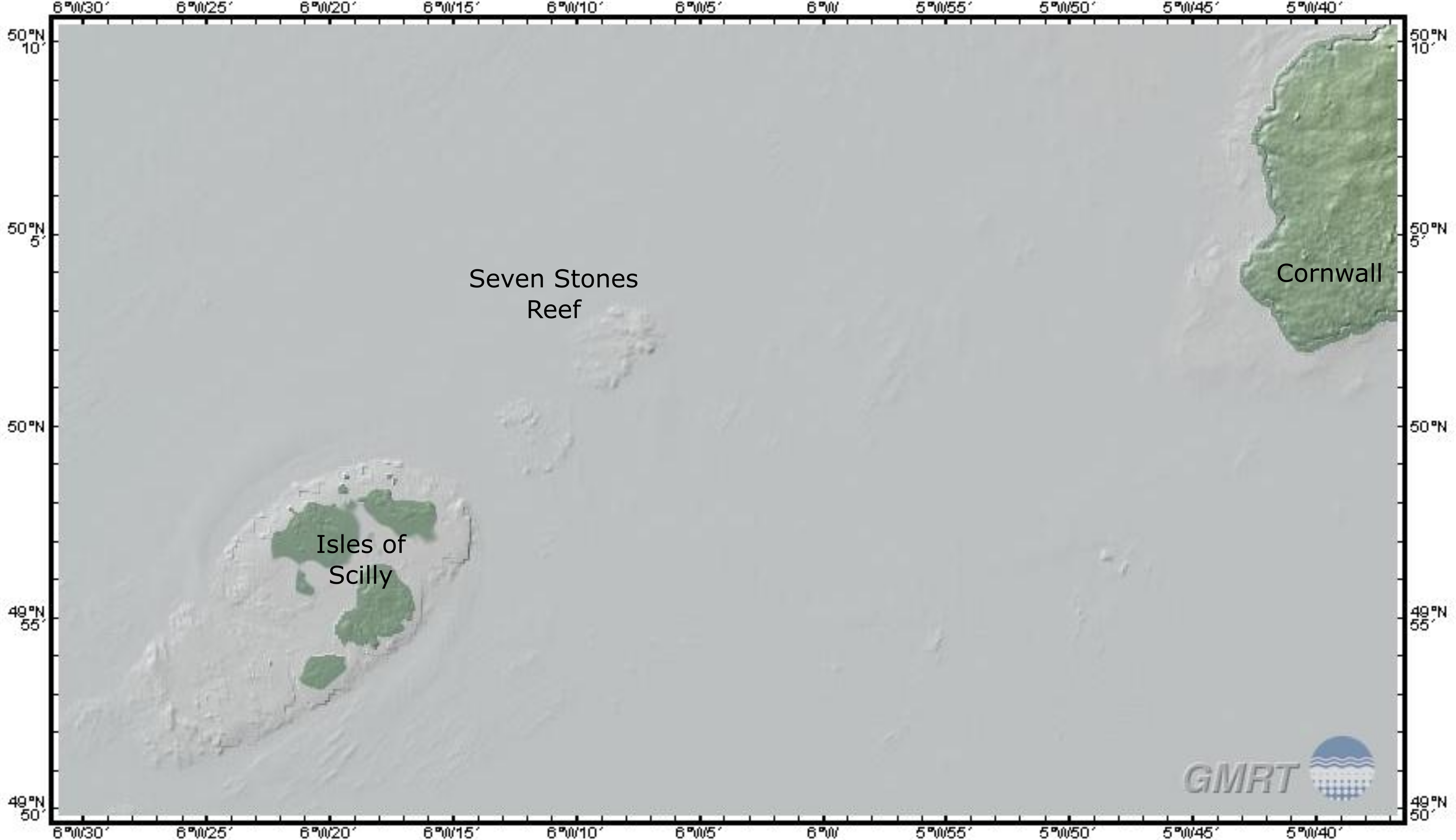
Topographic map of the seafloor between the Isles of Scilly and Cornwall, showing location of the Seven Stones Reef

The Seven Stones reef (Lethosow in Cornish) is a rocky reef nearly 15 miles (24 km) west of Land's End, Cornwall and 7 miles (11 km) east-northeast of the Isles of Scilly. The reef consists of two groups of rocks and is nearly 2 miles (3.2 km) long and 1 mile (1.6 km) in breadth. They rise out of deep water and are a navigational hazard for shipping with 71 named wrecks and an estimated 200 shipwrecks overall. The most infamous is the Torrey Canyon in 1967, which was at that time the world's costliest shipping disaster and, to date, still the worst oil spill on the coast of the United Kingdom.

The Sevenstones lightvessel has been situated to the east of the reef since 1841, to warn ships of the danger and to mark the western boundary of a major north/south shipping route between the Isles of Scilly and the Cornish coast. An automatic weather station is on the lightvessel.

== Geography ==
Situated between Cornwall and the Isles of Scilly, the Seven Stones reef consists of seven (or eight) peaks, some of which appear at half ebb and others at low tide. They rise out of deep water, at 60 fathoms (110 m) and extend nearly two miles from north-northwest to south-southeast and are about a mile wide. The sea always breaks over the reef and in good weather, breakers are visible up to 12 miles (19 km) away. The rocks consist of small-grained granite which is part of the larger Cornubian batholith. The batholith formed during the Early Permian period, from about 300 to 275 Ma, at a late stage in the Variscan orogeny. Some of the stones have been given names and include Flat Ledge, Flemish Ledges, North-east Rocks, Pollard's Rock, South Rock and a ledge known as the Town.

During the 1960s the reef was fished by a small fleet of French fishing vessels for crab, crayfish and lobster. Some of these vessels were the first on the scene when the Torrey Canyon ran aground in 1967. On the vertical surfaces of the more exposed rocks there are clusters of jewel anemones and hydroids, and plumose anemones.

== Shipwrecks ==
The reef is a major hazard to shipping as it is on the western boundary of a major north/south shipping route between the Cornish coast and the Isles of Scilly. The lightvessel, which has been on site since 1841, is 2.5 miles (4.0 km) to the north-east, not on the reef, a safety measure, as the sea is less rough away from the reef and also to ensure passing ships give the reef a wide berth. It is estimated that there are over 200 shipwrecks although only 71 are named.

The first recorded wreck was in early March 1656. Two English men o'war, the Primrose and Mayflower, were searching for two Spanish frigates which had been patrolling the area and had captured a Bristol bound vessel. The sixth rate, 22 gun man o'war, Primrose lost her main topmast near the Longships, off Land's End and drifted onto the Seven Stones. She managed to free herself and later sank in 60 fathoms (110 m) taking sixteen men, two women and a child with her. At the investigation into the loss, Trinity House, on behalf of the Admiralty, stated that they could not find any chart that showed the reef. The Admiralty found that there was no neglect either by the Officers or company, the place of wreck being a rock not visible nor described in any chart they could find. The largest loss of life was on 27 February 1748 with the sinking of the fourteen-gun sloop HMS Lizard which was wrecked with the loss of over one hundred crew.

On 18 March 1967, the world's first major oil pollution incident occurred when the supertanker Torrey Canyon hit the Pollard's Rock, tearing a 610 ft (186 m) gash in her side and spilling 860,000 barrels of oil into the sea. Westerly winds and currents caused the oil to pollute 120 miles (190 km) of the Cornish coast and 50 miles (80 km) of the Brittany coast. She now lies in 98 ft (30 m) of water. Large amounts of toxic detergent was sprayed on the oil in an attempt to disperse it and, along with the oil, accounted for the loss of much of the marine life and 15,000 birds. At the time it was the world's costliest shipping disaster, and to date, still the worst oil spill on the coast of the United Kingdom.

== Seven Stones lightvessel ==
The government was first petitioned for a light on the reef in 1826 (with no success), and a second petition in 1839 was supported by the British Channel ports, Liverpool merchants and the Chamber of Commerce of Waterford. A meeting held on 21 February 1840 in Falmouth declared the reef would shorten the route around the Isles of Scilly by up to 36 hours, and on 31 July 1841 a lightvessel (also known as a lightship) was seen at nearby St Mary's, Isles of Scilly.

A lightvessel was first moored near the reef on 20 August 1841 and exhibited its first light on 1 September 1841. She is permanently anchored in 40 fathoms (73 m) and is 2.5 miles (4.0 km) north-east of the reef. Just over a year later on 25 November 1842 her cable parted and she almost became a wreck when she drove over the reef at high tide. The crew steered the ship to New Grimsby, Tresco where she stayed until 6 January 1843. She broke adrift again that January and went over the reef a second time the following March. Two of the crew drowned on 15 October 1851 when one of the lightship's longboats capsized, in a squall, on a journey from Scilly with stores. A meteor exploded over the lightvessel, at 2 am on 13 November 1872, showering the deck with cinders. The ship was replaced with a lighted buoy during the Second World War after being frequently bombed and machine-gunned by German pilots.

Since 1987, the ship has been automated and unmanned with the accommodation and storage areas filled with foam to help with buoyancy in the event of a collision.

The Seven Stones lightvessel also acts as an automatic weather station.

== Folklore ==
There is a legend, part of the King Arthur scenario, that there was once a land between Cornwall and the Isles of Scilly, known as Lyonesse, with several towns and 140 churches. In the legend it was flooded and became sea. Only one man survived, Trevelyan, who riding on a white horse managed to reach dry land. The area is also part of Arthurian legend when Merlin cast a spell to engulf the land and the forces of Mordred who were chasing the fleeing army of King Arthur, whom he had just slain in battle. Arthur's supporters managed to reach high ground in the Isles of Scilly. Fishermen are said to be able to hear the sound of church bells. Rising sea levels since the last ice age fathered the legend and there may have been an island in the not too distant past.

== See also ==
- List of shipwrecks of Cornwall
- List of shipwrecks of the Isles of Scilly
