= Kuwait National Petroleum Company =

State-owned oil refining company

Coordinates: 29°5′34″N 48°5′14″E

State of Kuwait Kuwait National Petroleum Company (KNPC)
- شركة البترول الوطنية الكويتية

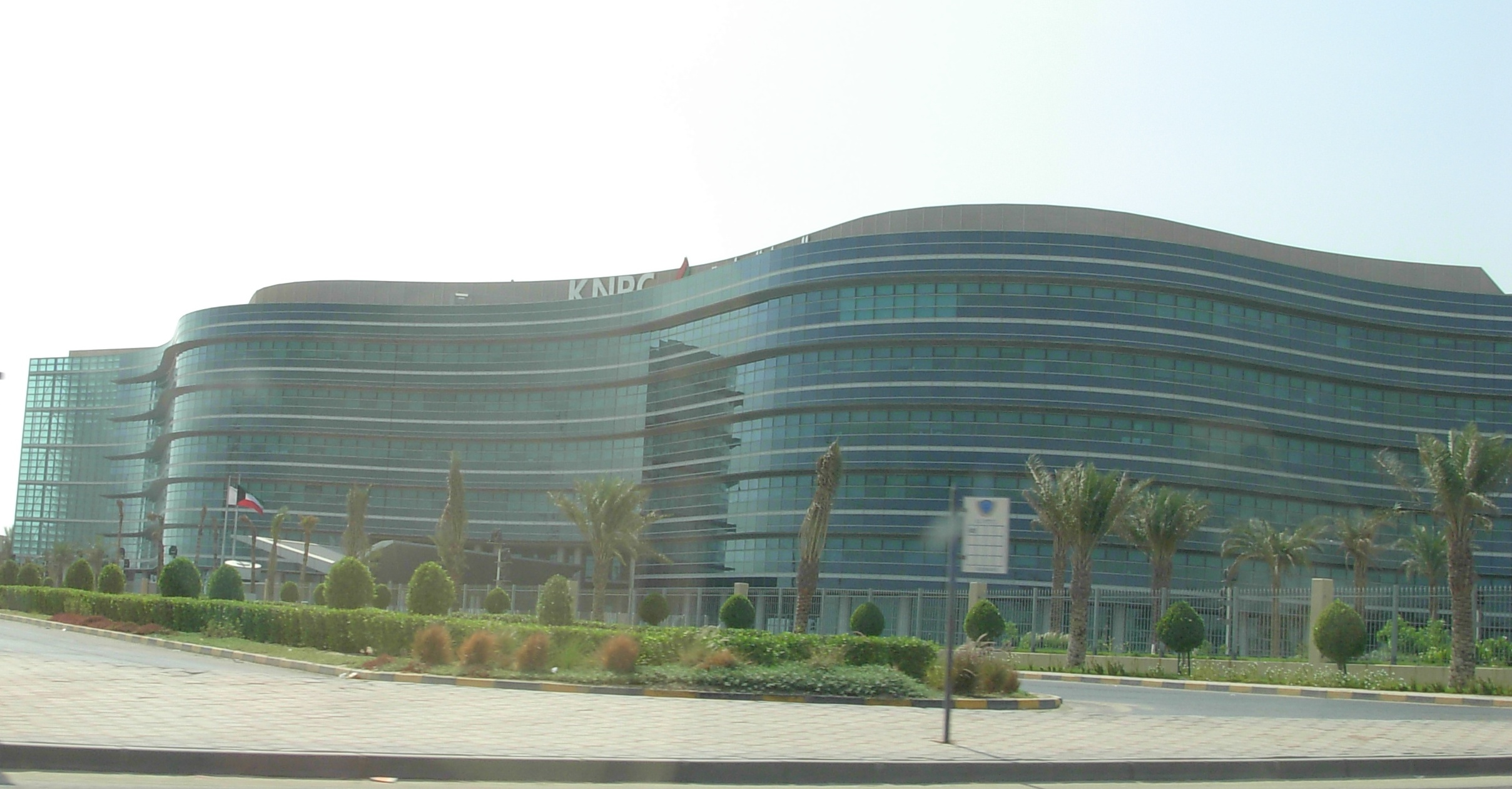
- KNPC Headoffice

Agency overview
- Headquarters: Al Ahmadi (Kuwait)
- Agency executive: Wadha Ahmed Al-Khateeb, Chief Executive Officer
- Parent agency: Kuwait Petroleum Corporation
- Website: https://www.knpc.com

The Kuwait National Petroleum Company (KNPC) (Arabic: شركة البترول الوطنية الكويتية) is the national oil refining company of Kuwait. Established in October 1960, KNPC has the mandate for oil refining, gas liquefaction, and distribution of petroleum goods within the local market. KNPC also handles CFP (Clean Fuel project).

== History ==
Established in October 1960 as a share-holding company owned by the Kuwait government and private sector, KNPC became fully government-owned in 1975. Since 1968 the company had been exporting petroleum products from its Shuaiba Refinery. In April 2017, Kuwait closed the Shuaiba refinery, which was one of the oldest oil facilities in the region. In 1980, following the restructuring of the oil sector in Kuwait, KNPC was placed under the newly created Kuwait Petroleum Corporation (KPC), which was also government owned. In this revised structure, KNPC took control of distributing petroleum products within Kuwait, along with the ownership of the Mina Ahmadi and Mina Abdullah refineries. On 20 March 2026, Iran sent drones that attacked and damaged units in the Mina Al-Ahmadi refinery, as part of the 2026 Iran war.

== Refineries ==
- Mina Abdullah Refinery: Built in 1958 by the American Independent Oil Company, Mina Abdullah was passed to the Kuwaiti state in 1975 and transferred to KNPC in 1978. Spanning 7,835,000 m^{2}, and located 46 km south of Kuwait City, Mina Abdullah is capable of refining 280,000 barrels per day (45,000 m^{3}/d) (BPD).
- Mina Al-Ahmadi refinery: Initially built in 1949, the refinery was handed over to KNPC in 1980. Spanning 10,534,000 m^{2}, it is located 40 km south of Kuwait City with a production capacity of 346—466,000 bbl/d (74,100 m^{3}/d). In 2014 KNPC started the production of ultra-low-sulfur diesel (ULSD) at Mina Al-Ahmadi refinery.
- Shuaiba Refinery: Built in 1966, Shuaiba Refinery was the first refinery in the region to be built by a national company. The refinery spanned 1,332,000 m^{2} and was located 50 km south of Kuwait City within the Shuaiba Industrial Area. The refinery had a capacity of 200,000 bbl/d (32,000 m^{3}/d). In March 2017 the refinery was shut down in order that its facilities could be repurposed for the country's Clean Fuels Project (CFP).
- Al Zour Refinery: KNPC released plans to build a fourth refinery known as Al-Zour in 2006. In 2012 the plans were revamped because of the re-approval by the Supreme Petroleum Council of Kuwait. The refinery is expected to have a capacity of 615,000 bbl/d (97,800 m^{3}/d), making it the largest refinery in the middle east. In May 2008, Kuwait National Petroleum Company awarded the four remaining EPC contracts: Process Package 1 was awarded to the Consortium of JGC Corporation and GS Engineering & Construction, Process Package 2 was awarded to SK Engineering & Construction, Storage Tanks Package was awarded to Daelim Industrial Company, Marine Works Package was awarded to Hyundai Engineering & Construction, and The Offsites & Utilities package was awarded to Fluor Corporation. Finally, the first phase of Al-Zour integrated refining and petrochemical complex has been commissioned in January 2023.

== Recruitment ==
KNPC provides scholarships and training and sponsors refinery operation specialization at the College of Technological Studies of The Public Authority for Applied Education and Training (PAAET).

== Merger ==
In April 2025, Kuwait Petroleum Corporation (KPC) has announced the merger of The Kuwait National Petroleum Company (KNPC) with the Kuwait Integrated Petroleum Industries Company (KIPIC).

== See also ==
- Kuwait Oil Company
- Economy of Kuwait
