= Kuwait–Saudi Arabia relations =

- Kuwait: Saudi Arabia

Both Kuwait and Saudi Arabia are members of the Gulf Cooperation Council. Historically, there was a Saudi–Kuwaiti neutral zone inhabited by coastal fishermen; however, with the discovery of oil, the countries agreed to divide the territory, and reached an agreement in 1969.

== History ==
=== Ottoman era ===
Relations between Kuwait and the Saudi states were initially marked by frequent military conflict. In 1793, the Sheikhdom of Kuwait, with the assistance of Great Britain and the British East India Company, repelled an invasion by Ibn Ufaisan of the First Saudi State. In 1811, Kuwait helped defend Bahrain against a Saudi force led by Rahman ibn Jabir al-Jalahimah, during the Battle of Khakeekera. Later, in 1871, Kuwait supported the Ottoman Empire in the Al-Hasa Expedition against the Second Saudi State, contributing to the restoration of Ottoman control over Al-Hasa. In recognition of Kuwait's role, Sheikh Abdullah II Al Sabah was awarded the honorific title of Kaymakam by the Ottoman authorities.

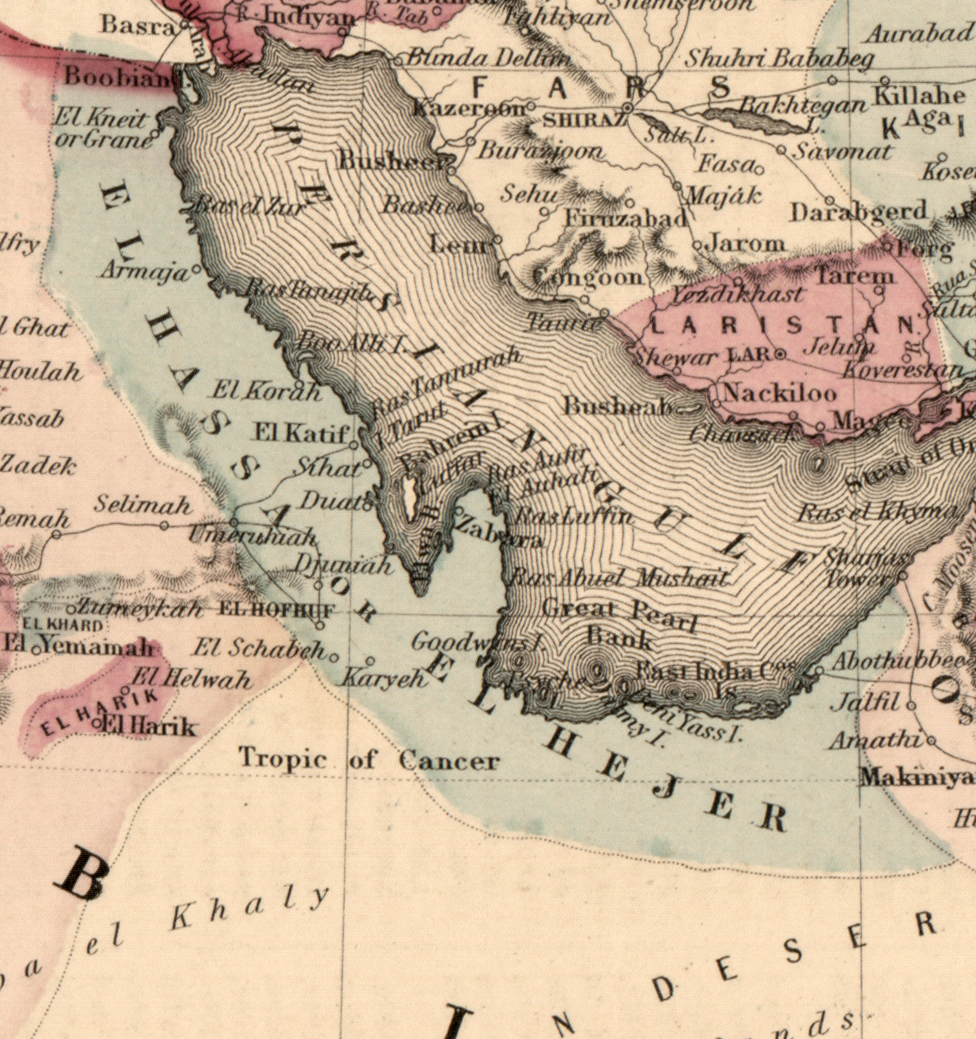
Al Hasa in the 19th-century

At the beginning of the 20th century, relations continued to be shaped by regional warfare. In 1901, Kuwait unsuccessfully attempted to annex Najd but successfully repelled a Rashidi counteroffensive during the Kuwaiti–Rashidi War. The 1903 Battle of Jo-Laban between Kuwait and Jabal Shammar directly marked the beginning of the Saudi-Rashidi War. By 1910, however, Kuwait and the Saudis temporarily found themselves fighting on the same side, suffering a joint defeat to the Al Muntafiq confederation at the Battle of Hadiya.

=== British era ===
In 1920, King Ibn Saud attempted to annex Kuwait and incorporate it into the Third Saudi State, leading to the Kuwait–Najd War. Although Kuwaiti forces, supported by the British, successfully repelled the invasion, the conflict was followed by the 1922 Uqair Protocol, which established Kuwait's modern boundaries. During the negotiations, Ibn Saud persuaded the British High Commissioner in Iraq, Sir Percy Cox, to award the Saudis roughly two-thirds of the disputed territory. Kuwait was not represented at the conference and therefore had no role in the negotiations.

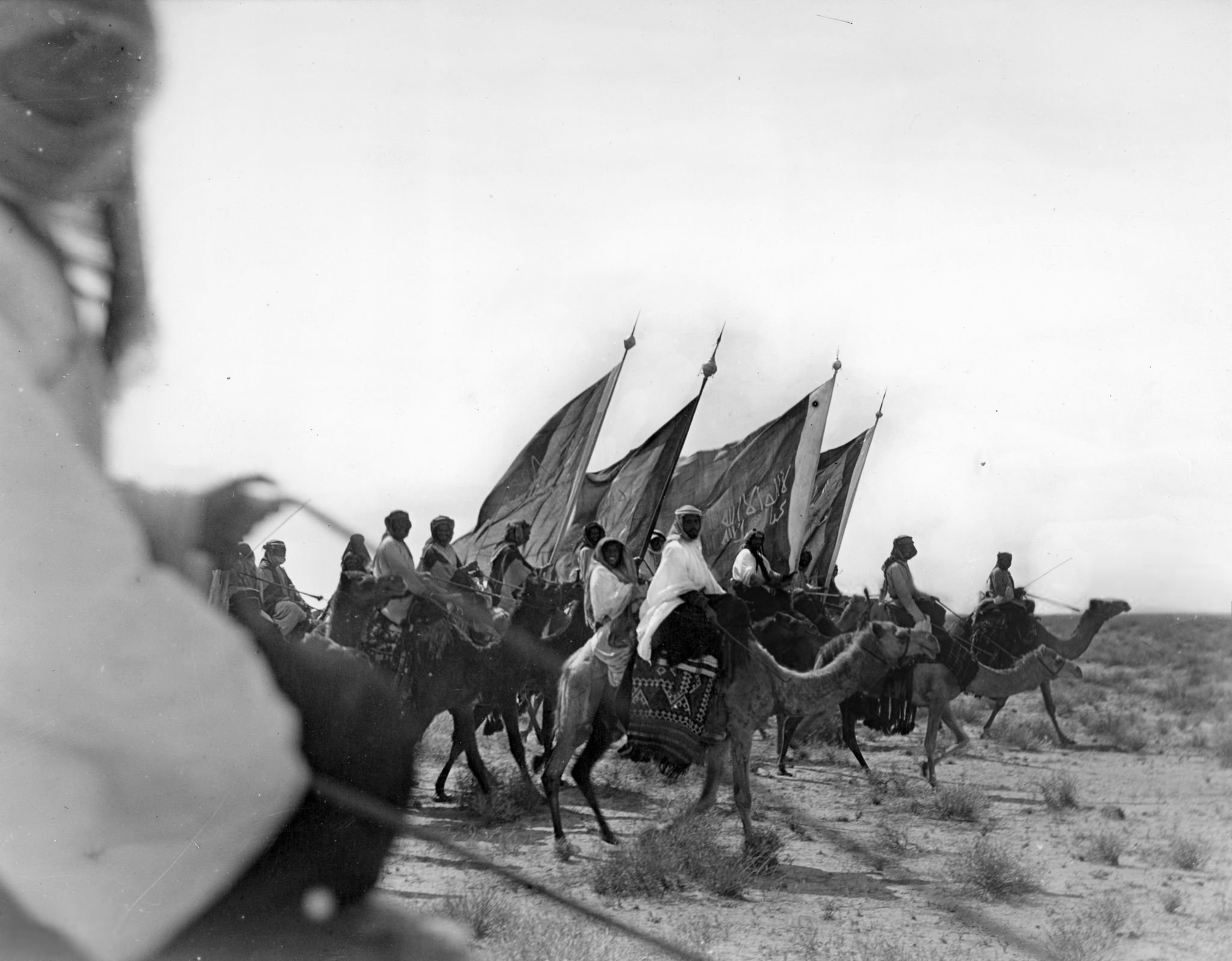
Ikhwan tribesman in 1911

Relations remained strained in the years that followed. Between 1923 and 1937, Saudi Arabia imposed a trade blockade on Kuwait that significantly disrupted the Kuwaiti economy, with the aim of increasing pressure on Kuwait and expanding Saudi territorial control. Despite these tensions, Saudi Arabia supported Kuwait during the 1927–1930 border raids into Kuwait that spilled over from the Ikhwan Revolt.

Saudi Arabia also supported Kuwait during Operation Vantage in 1961, contributing to the multinational effort to deter an Iraqi invasion following Kuwait's declaration of independence and marking the beginning of a period of generally cooperative relations between the two countries.

=== Modern history ===
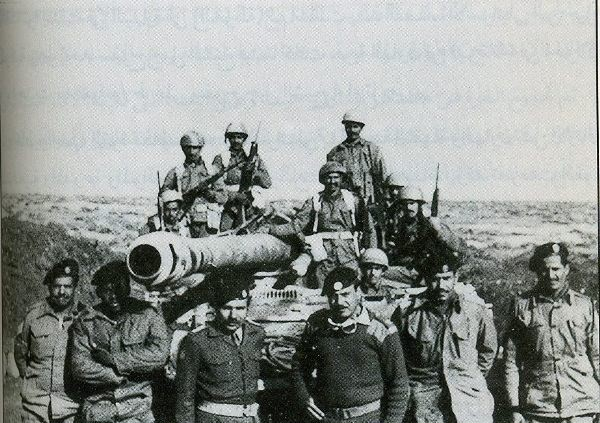
The Kuwaiti army in the October War, 1973

During the Arab–Israeli conflict, Kuwait and Saudi Arabia closely coordinated their foreign policies. Kuwait joined the Saudi-led oil embargoes of 1967 and 1973 to pressure Western governments supporting Israel. During the 1973 October War, the two countries also fought on the same side as members of the Arab coalition against Israel.

Despite generally close relations, tensions occasionally arose. In February 1990, Saudi Arabia boycotted the 10th Arabian Gulf Cup hosted in Kuwait after objecting to the tournament's logo, which depicted two horses that Saudi officials believed symbolized the legendary steeds associated with the Kuwaiti victory in the Battle of Jahra in 1920.

In August 1990, following the Iraqi invasion of Kuwait, Saudi Arabia participated in the Gulf War to expel Iraqi forces from the country. Some of the Kuwaiti Royal family members fled to Saudi Arabia during this time. Saudi and Coalition forces also repelled Iraqi forces when they breached the Kuwaiti-Saudi border in 1991. This conflict within the larger Gulf War was known as the Battle of Khafji.

== Resident diplomatic missions ==
- Kuwait has an embassy in Riyadh.
- Saudi Arabia has an embassy in Kuwait City.

== See also ==
- Foreign relations of Kuwait
- Foreign relations of Saudi Arabia
- Kuwait–Saudi Arabia border
