= Saudi Arabian–Kuwaiti neutral zone =

1922–1970 border zone between Kuwait and Saudi Arabia

- 1922–1970
- The former Divided Zone between Saudi Arabia and Kuwait.
- Official languages: Arabic
- History
  - Established: 1922
  - Disestablished: 1970
| Preceded by | Succeeded by |
| Sultanate of Nejd; Emirate of Kuwait | Saudi Arabia; State of Kuwait |

The Saudi Arabian–Kuwaiti neutral zone, also known as the Divided Zone, was an area of 5,770 km^{2} (2,230 sq mi) between the borders of Saudi Arabia and Kuwait that was left undefined when the border was established by the Uqair Convention of 2 December 1922.

According to historian Daniel Yergin, "The Neutral Zone was the two thousand or so square miles of barren desert that had been carved out by the British in 1922 in the course of drawing a border between Kuwait and Saudi Arabia. In order to accommodate the Bedouins, who wandered back and forth between Kuwait and Saudi Arabia and for whom nationality was a hazy concept, it was agreed that the two countries would share sovereignty over the area."

The Uqair Convention stated that "the Government of Najd and Kuwait will share equal rights until through the good offices of the Government of Great Britain a further agreement is made between Najd and Kuwait concerning it".

There was however little interest in a more definitive settlement in the Neutral Zone until the 1938 discovery of oil in the Burgan (Burqan) area of Kuwait. With the possibility of oil within the Neutral Zone itself, concessions were granted by Kuwait in 1948 to the American Independent Oil Company and in 1949 by Saudi Arabia to the Pacific Western Oil Corporation, (Note: since 1932 controlled by J. Paul Getty and in 1956 was renamed the Getty Oil Company) the two companies cooperatively explored and developed the zone. Oil was discovered in March 1953 and the reservoirs were of significant size. The first oil was shipped in January 1954. In 1957, Saudi Arabia signed a concession agreement with the Japanese-owned Arabian Oil Co., and Kuwait signed in 1958. That concession expired in 2000. The company made its first offshore discovery in January 1960.

The partitioning negotiations commenced shortly after the rulers of Kuwait and Saudi Arabia met and decided, in October 1960, that the Neutral Zone should be divided. On 7 July 1965, the two governments signed an agreement to partition the zone (which took effect on 25 July 1966). A demarcation agreement dividing the Neutral Zone was signed on 17 December 1967 but did not formally take effect until the exchange of instruments and signing which took place in Kuwait on 18 December 1969. Ratification followed on 18 January 1970, and the agreement was published in the Kuwaiti Official Gazette on 25 January 1970.

The zone was never assigned an ISO 3166 code since it was partitioned before the adoption of ISO 3166 in 1974. But for example in trade journals of the oil industry it was treated separately like a country.

The area was quickly, but briefly, overrun during the First Gulf War by Iraqi forces in 1991 after they invaded and occupied Kuwait; however, Coalition forces composed of American and Saudi contingents repelled the Iraqi offensive and liberated the area and the rest of Kuwait.

Despite the zone being partitioned half a century ago, oil pumping is still done by agreements.

== Oil industry ==
The conclusion of the negotiations between American Independent and the Kuwaiti government was announced on July 6, 1948. Ralph Davies, former head of the Petroleum Administration for War, created during World War 2 to orchestrate the U.S. domestic petroleum industry, negotiated on behalf of American Independent. The terms were not disclosed officially and were reported as $7,000,000 initial bonus, $600,000 per year, 15% of profits and a 33-35 cents per barrel royalty.

Geologist Paul T. Walton on behalf of Western Pacific Oil negotiated with King Ibn Saud in the Shepheard's Hotel in Cairo. The concession was granted for a $9.5 million initial bonus, 55 cents per barrel production royalty with a minimum of $1 million to be paid each year (corresponds to 1,818,182bbl) and a 25% interest in net profits.

The two companies on June 30, 1949, signed an agreement amongst themselves for the first phase which involved the drilling of 4 holes to a depth of 5,000 ft and signed a further agreement on February 14, 1950, for a phase of seismographic and core drilling work.

The headquarters for the exploration crews was a refurbished Landing Ship, Tank, LST 1014, renamed MV Aminoil. The conversion was carried out by Levingston Shipbuilding Company in Orange, Texas from June 15 till September 30, 1949. The ship and the 3,000 tons of cargo represented an investment of $2 million. With the arrival of this mobile base camp via the Suez Canal in the Persian Gulf at the end of November 1949, exploration in the neutral zone commenced. The first drilling location was 25 miles inland on the border with Kuwait, in proximity to the prolific Burghan field.

During 1950, three dry holes were drilled. Wafra No. 1 was spudded on December 11, 1949, and completed at 5,020 ft on February 4, Wafra No. 2 was spudded 2 miles west of No. 1 on February 22 and abandoned at a depth of 5,250 ft on June 9. Wafra No. 3 (Note: By supplemental agreement of June 23, 1950 was drilled as an exploratory well not counting towards the 4 wells in the original agreement) reached 5,000 ft on October 20. In this early phase a fourth well, Fuwaris No. 1 (Note: reportedly 6 miles west of Wafra No. 3 and was below 7,000ft in January 1951 but abandoned as dry hole at ca. 9,400ft) also found nothing. In the meantime a comprehensive geophysical campaign was underway and in March 1952 the fifth wildcat (Al Hazaim) was spudded closer to the coast, but abandoned as a dry hole at 7,429 ft by June 1952. The 5-well exploratory campaign at the end of 1952 had resulted in an expenditure of $30 million and what appears to have been a gamble to drill early concurrently with geophysical work had not paid off.

Wafra No. 4 was the discovery well. It was spudded on February 10, 1953, and on March 17, 1953, struck oil at 3,470 ft and was completed at 3,620 ft.

At the end of 1953 a 34-mile 8- and 10-inch pipeline (Note: 12 miles of 8-inch and 22 miles of 10-inch surplus pipe purchased from Aramco. A single crew completed ca. 3,000ft per day with one stringer bead man and 5 production welders. There is a change in bearing in the line at mile 10 from the field, where it takes a slight left turn. This is due to a last minute 13 mile northward relocation of the terminal from the original point called Ras al Jaliyah (map:).) was completed to the Mena Abdulla terminal (29.0151°N 48.16065°E) in Kuwait, which was built concurrently and located immediately south of the Mena el Ahmadi terminal of the Kuwait Oil Company. In the first stage of completion the new infrastructure could pump 20,000 barrels per day from field to terminal tanks. The first shipment (92,000bbl) of oil sailed aboard the Tsuruoki Maru on January 13, 1954, bound for the 14,000bpd refinery of the Daikyo Oil Co. in Yokkaichi (Japan). At which time there were 2x73,000bbl storage tanks completed. (Note: Due to long lead times on new tanks, two riveted tanks were dismantled in Wichita, Kansas and shipped abroad.) The 16-inch 7,500bbl/hour submarine loading line had a length of 12,000 ft and established a berth at a depth of 48 ft of water. See map in the World Petroleum 1954-02 issue. Aminoil completed a 30,000bpd topping plant at the end of 1958 and to supply it laid a 12-inch loop line to parallel the exiting 8/10-inch line. A 32-mile 24-inch loop line was finished in 1961. The same year a 200 ft diameter, 64 ft high 600,000bbl tank was built, the largest oil tank in the world at the time. A 100,000bpd expansion of the topping plant was due to begin operations in 1962.

Pacific Western eventually established their own loading dock and named it Mena Saud (28.74146°N 48.39284°E) to honor the Sheikh who had ruled that they would not be allowed to continue using Mena Abdulla. A 8,674 ft 20-inch outer diameter 1/2-inch thick loading line was welded on the beach and on October 23, 1954, was floated in place and sunk at Ras az Zour. It had no coating and it did have cathodic protection. A 10-inch pipe line connected the field to the terminal. The terminal became operational in early 1955. Getty had a 50,000bpd topping plant in operation in 1959. A 31-mile 18-inch spiral weld loop line proved to be unserviceable and was replaced.

Because of the low pressure encountered at the wells of the Wafra field, pumping jacks were soon introduced. In August 1959, one half of the 62 producers were already pumping and Getty Oil had plans to reconfigure all their wells.

Oil production by year, by field (x1,000 barrels)
| Year | Wafra | Khafji | Fuwaris | Gudair | Al Hout |
|---|---|---|---|---|---|
| 1954 | 6,023 | | | | |
| 1955 | 8,848 | | | | |
| 1956 | 11,725 | | | | |
| 1957 | 23,300 | | | | |
| 1958 | 29,510 | | | | |
| 1959 | 41,980 | 420 | | | |
| 1960 | 49,270 | 540 | | | |
| 1961 | 57,705 | 7,482 | | | |
| 1962 | 67,319 | 21,936 | | | |
| 1963 | 66,254 | 48,246 | | | |
| 1964 | 68,200 | 61,251 | 1,949 | | |
| 1965 | 64,970 | 65,235 | 2,046 | | |
| 1966 | 56,210 | 92,969 | 1,545 | 2,700 | |
| 1967 | 49,665 | 101,848 | 1,207 | 0 | |
| 1968 | 33,412 | 109,504 | 706 | 13,078 | |
| 1969 | 30,373 | 110,596 | 392 | 4,699 | 7,092 |
| 1970 | 39,936 | 119,305 | 490 | 16,944 | 7,225 |
| 1971 | 45,000 | 127,809 | 832 | 19,441 | 6,031 |
| 1972 | 38,422 | 144,896 | 788 | 17,885 | 5,309 |
| 1973 | 30,020 | 139,836 | 876 | 16,167 | 4,029 |
| 1974 | 39,655 | 135,918 | 910 | 19,108 | 2,558 |
| 1975 | 43,441 | 117,000 | 945 | 18,149 | 2,100 |
| 1976 | 40,165 | 109,490 | 1,142 | 17,991 | 2,925 |
| 1977 | 42,657 | 69,380 | 1,068 | 20,200 | 2,900 |
| 1978 | 38,520 | 109,118 | 1,204 | 19,280 | 2,026 |
| 1979 | 40,723 | 134,600 | 955 | 18,538 | 2,320 |
| 1980 | 38,040 | 137,345 | 588 | 17,930 | 2,555 |

Producing fields and zones
| Field | Zone | Discovery | Depth | API | Cumulative 1961 |
|---|---|---|---|---|---|
| Wafra | Burgan | 1953 | 3,700 | 24 | 88,048,919 |
| Wafra | Eocene | 1954 | 1,200 - 2,200 | 17 - 19 | 63,607,691 |
| Wafra | Ratawi | 1955 | 7,100 | 25 | 47,456,827 |
| Khafji | | 1960 | 5,500 | 26 | 1,909,550 |

Trade of neutral zone crude oil (barrels) (Note: 1954 1955 1956 1957)
| Destination | 1954 | 1955 | | 1956 | | 1957 | |
| | | Aminoil | PacWes | Aminoil | Getty | Aminoil | Getty |
|---|---|---|---|---|---|---|---|
| USA | 4,148,027 | 1,424,836 | 1,407,069 | 243,971 | 3,284,005 | 739,152 | 12,580,231 |
| Japan | 1,190,438 | 904,725 | 1,483,257 | 3,680,054 | 1,023,803 | 4,887,678 | 189,317 |
| Italy | 174,988 | 1,473,739 | | 1,496,564 | | 2,424,976 | 313,132 |
| France | 117,139 | 443,377 | 1,094,113 | | 1,587,211 | 134,515 | |
| Germany | 70,117 | 132,758 | | | | | |
| Egypt | | | | | 112,974 | | 896,105 |
| Netherlands | | | | | | 531,387 | |
| Total | | 4,379,435 | 3,984,439 | 5,420,589 | 6,017,993 | 8,717,708 | 13,978,785 |
| Total | 5,700,709 | 8,363,874 | | 11,438,582 | | 22,696,493 | |

Wells completed (Note: 1950-1952: see text above; 1953: 1954: 1955: 1956: 1957-1960:)
| Year | Oil | Gas | Dry | Wildcats | Feet |
|---|---|---|---|---|---|
| 1950-1952 | 0 | 0 | 0 | 5 | ca. 32,000 |
| 1953 | 4 | 0 | 0 | 1 (Note: Wafra No. 4 - discovery well) | 20,635 |
| 1954 | 11 | 0 | 3 | | 56,391 |
| 1955 | 13 | 0 | 2 | | 58,754 |
| 1956 | 26 | 0 | 3 | | 83,985 |
| 1957 | 46 | 0 | 8 | 0 | 110,390 |
| 1958 | 37 | 0 | 12 | 0 | 102,424 |
| 1959 | 40 | 0 | 0 | 0 | 104,267 |
| 1960 | 80 | 0 | 0 | 0 | 202,038 |

== 2020s oil and gas discoveries ==
In December 2022, Saudi Aramco and Kuwait Gulf Oil Company signed a Memorandum of Understanding to jointly develop the Durra gas field, located in the neutral zone. The development aims at producing 280,000,000 cubic metres (9.9×10^{9} cu ft) of natural gas and 84,000 barrels of LNG per day.

On 26 May 2025, Saudi Arabia and Kuwait announced a new discovery (500bpd of 26 to 27 API gravity) 5 kilometers north of Wafra field.

== See also ==
- Geography of Kuwait
- Geography of Saudi Arabia
- Kuwait–Saudi Arabia border
- Kuwait–Saudi Arabia relations
- Saudi Arabian–Iraqi neutral zone
- Unification of Saudi Arabia
