= Kuwait–Saudi Arabia border =

International border

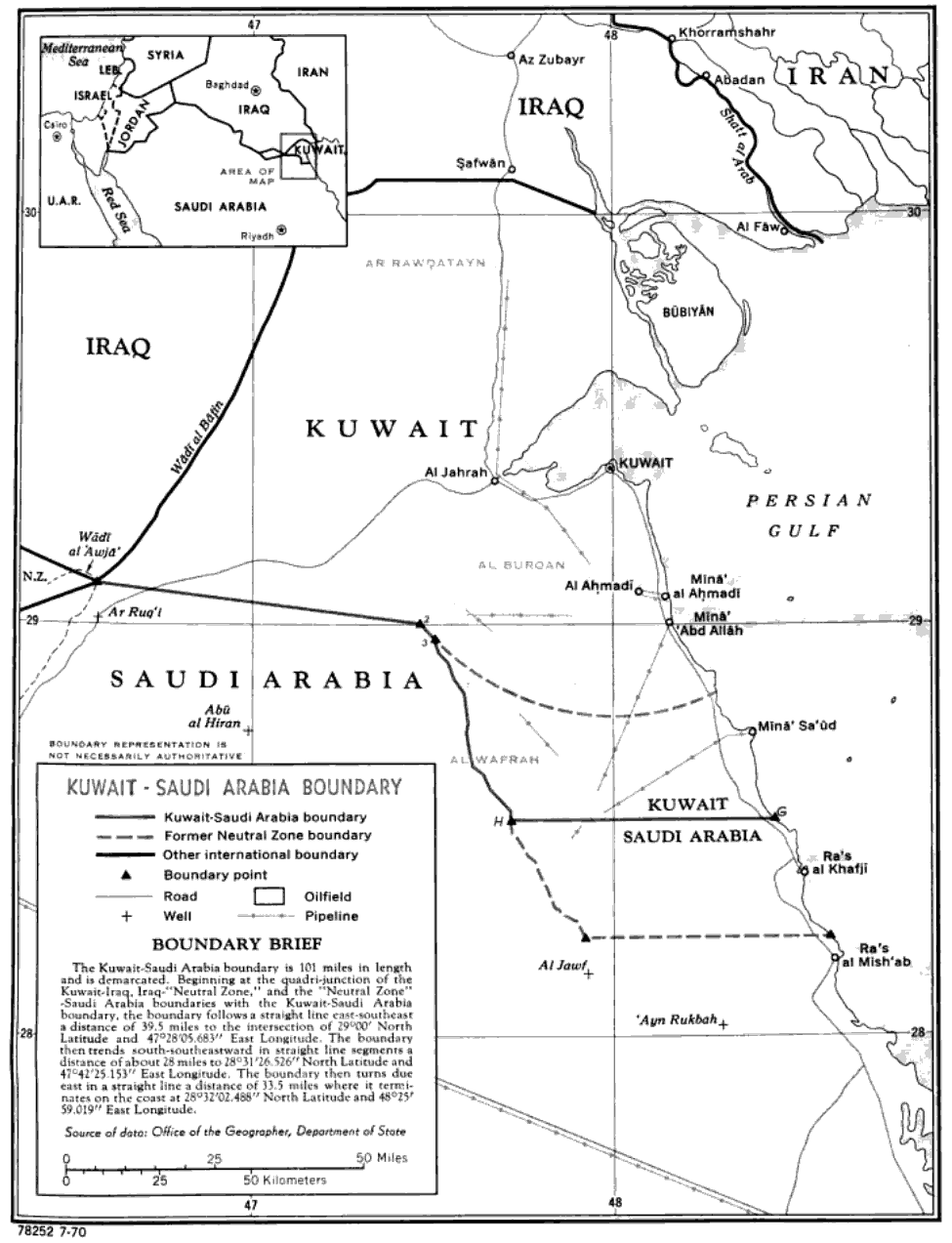
Map of the Kuwait-Saudi border

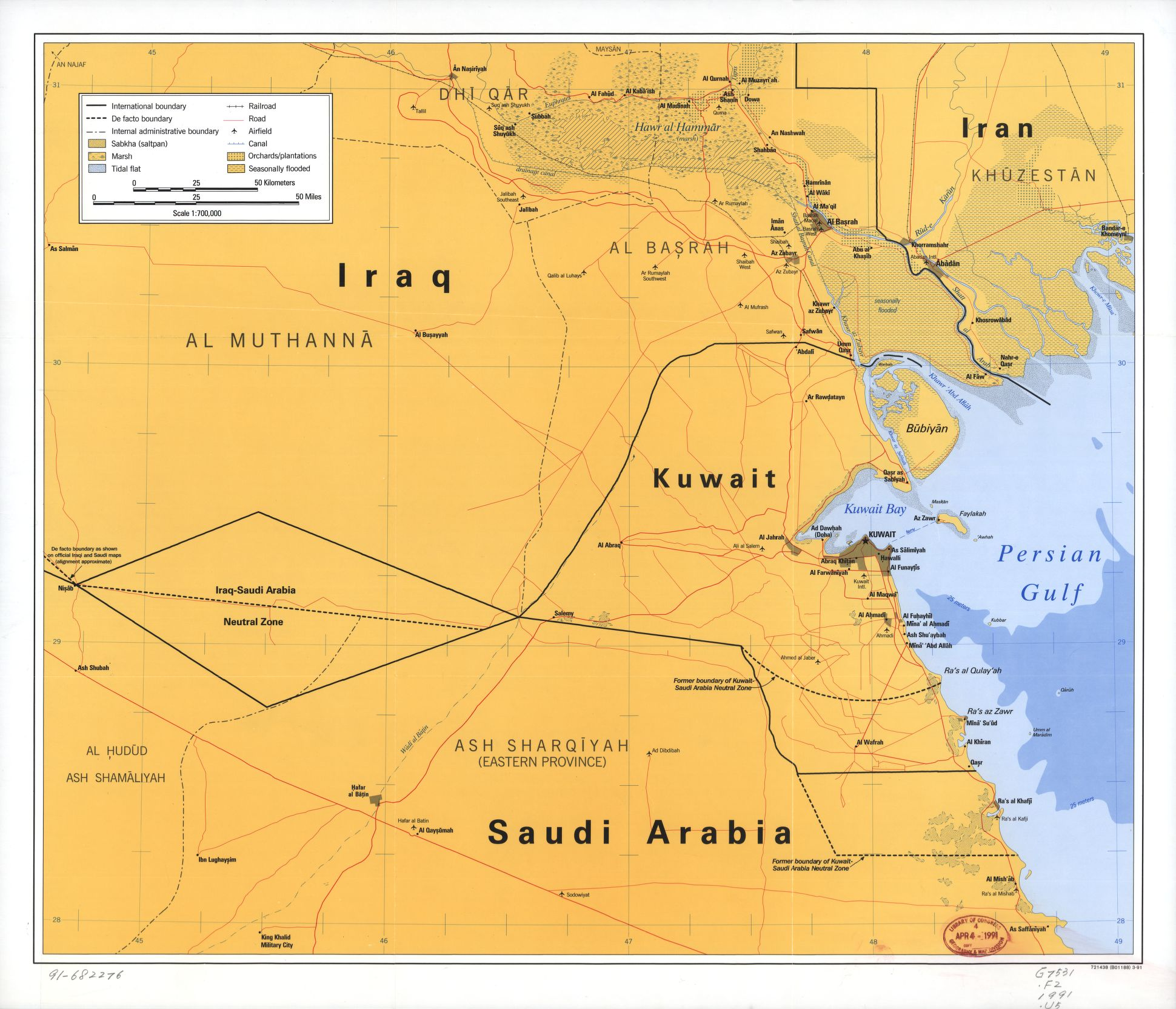
1991 map, with the former neutral zone marked out with dotted lines

Maps of the Kuwait-Saudi border

The Kuwait–Saudi Arabia border is 221 km (137 mi) in length and runs from the tripoint with Iraq in the west to the Persian Gulf coast in the east.

== Description ==
The border starts in the west at the tripoint with Iraq on the Wadi al-Batin; a straight line of 90 km (55 mi), angled slightly to the south-east, then proceeds eastwards. The border then turns southwards via a series of irregular lines, before turning sharply to the east, with a straight line of 70 km (43 mi) running to the Gulf coast.

== History ==
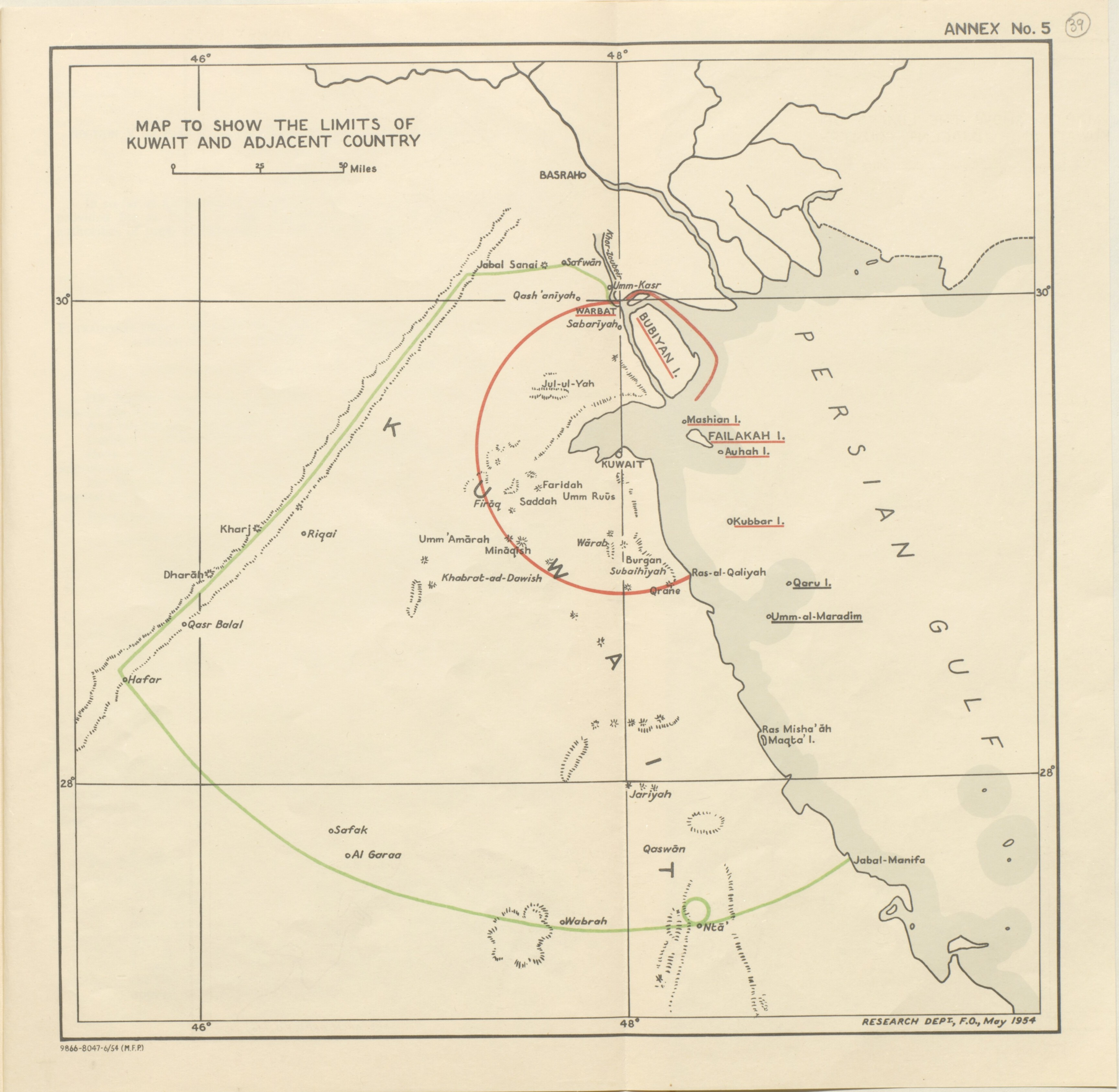
Map with red circle and green circle boundaries according to the Anglo-Ottoman Convention of 1913

Historically there was no clearly defined boundary in this part of the Arabian peninsula; at the start of the 20th century the Ottoman Empire controlled what is now Iraq and Britain controlled Kuwait as a protectorate, with the interior consisting of loosely organised Arab groupings, occasionally forming emirates, most prominent of which was the Emirate of Nejd and Hasa ruled by the al-Saud family. Britain and the Ottoman Empire theoretically divided their realms of influence via the so-called 'Blue' and 'Violet lines' in 1913–14, by which the Ottomans recognised British claims on Kuwait, divided from Ottoman Mesopotamia along the Wadi al-Batin (the so-called 'green line', see map right).

During the First World War, an Arab Revolt supported by Britain succeeded in removing the Ottomans from most of the Middle East; in the period following this Ibn Saud managed to expand his domains considerably, eventually proclaiming the Kingdom of Saudi Arabia in 1932. Ibn Saud claimed Kuwait as part of his new state, attempting to annex it in 1919, resulting in the Kuwait–Najd War; when that failed he instituted a blockade of Kuwait.

In December 1922 Percy Cox, British High Commissioner in the British Mandate of Iraq, met with Ibn Saud and signed the Uqair Protocol, which finalised Saudi Arabia's border with both Kuwait and Iraq. The treaty also created a large Saudi–Kuwaiti neutral zone in the southeast, where both parties were to share equal rights pending further agreement. When oil was later discovered in this zone it was agreed to partition it in 1965, this division being ratified in 1969–70, at which point the Kuwait-Saudi border was finalised at its current position.

Iraq invaded and annexed Kuwait in 1990, breaching the Kuwait–Saudi Arabia border in 1991 at the Battle of Khafji during the Gulf War.

== Border Crossings ==
The two main border crossings are at Salmi (Jahra Governorate) and Nuwaiseeb (Ahmadi Governorate).

== See also ==
- Kuwait-Saudi Arabia relations
