= Saudi Arabian–Iraqi neutral zone =

Former border zone between Iraq and Saudi Arabia

Coordinates: 28.983034°N 45.547498°E

Saudi Arabian–Iraqi neutral zone منطقة النزاع العراقي السعودي (Arabic) Mintaqat al-Niza‘ al-‘Iraqi as-Sa‘udi
- 1922–1991
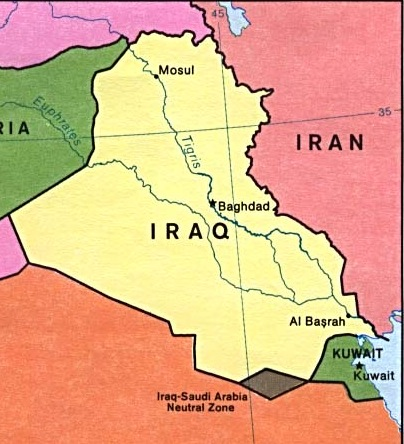
- The former Neutral Zone between Iraq and Saudi Arabia.
- Official languages: Arabic
- History
  - Established: 1922
  - Disestablished: 1991

Population
  - Estimate: >100 (1991)
- ISO 3166 code: NT
Preceded by	Succeeded by
Sultanate of Nejd; Mandatory Iraq	Saudi Arabia; Iraqi Republic

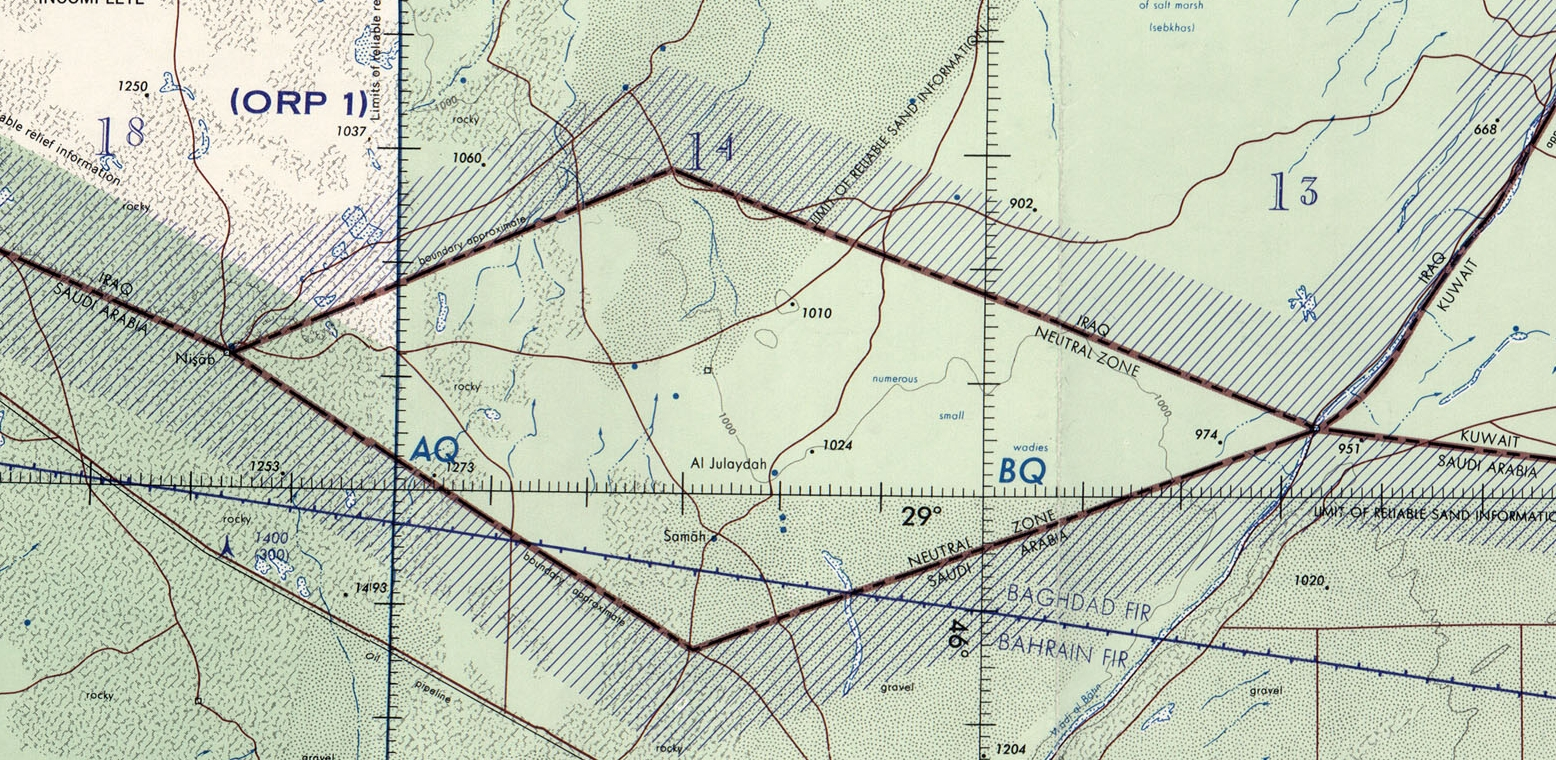
Navigation chart showing Iraq-Saudi Neutral Zone.

The Saudi Arabian–Iraqi neutral zone, also known as the neutral territory (NT) or neutral territory zone (NTZ), was a kite-shaped region of 7,044 km^{2} (1,741,000 acres) on the border between Saudi Arabia and Iraq within which the border between the two countries had not been settled. The neutral zone came into existence following the Uqair Protocol of 1922 that defined the border between Mandatory Iraq and the Sultanate of Nejd (Saudi Arabia's predecessor state). An agreement to partition the neutral zone was reached by Iraqi and Saudi representatives on 26 December 1981, and approved by the Iraqi National Assembly on 28 January 1982. The territory was divided on an unknown date between 28 January and 30 July 1982. Notice was given to the United Nations in June 1991.

Since there was no significant infrastructure or urban development in the zone, the population remained sparse and mainly ethnic Bedouin throughout the neutral zone's existence. The people living there were typically scattered in small groups, with limited interaction with the larger settled populations of Iraq or Saudi Arabia.

== History ==
The Treaty of Muhammarah (Khorramshahr), 5 May 1922, forestalled the imminent conflict between the United Kingdom, which held the mandate for Iraq, and the Kingdom of Nejd, which later became Saudi Arabia after it unified with the Kingdom of Hejaz. It was signed by Prince Ahmed bin Abdullah on behalf of Abdulaziz Ibn Saud, King of Najd, who did not ratify the treaty. The treaty specifically avoided defining boundaries. Following further negotiations, the Protocol of Uqair (Uqayr), 2 December 1922, defined most of the borders between them and created the neutral zone. The protocol was ratified by Abdulaziz.

No military or permanent buildings were to be built in or near the neutral zone, and nomads of both countries were to have unimpeded access to its pastures and wells.

Administrative division of the zone was achieved in 1975, and a border treaty concluded in 1981. For unknown reasons, the treaty was not filed with the United Nations, and nobody outside Iraq and Saudi Arabia was notified of the change nor shown maps with details of the new boundary. As the Gulf War approached in early 1991, Iraq cancelled all international agreements with Saudi Arabia since 1968. Saudi Arabia responded by registering all previous boundary agreements negotiated with Iraq at the United Nations in June 1991. Most official maps no longer show the rhombus-shaped neutral zone, but rather draw the boundary approximately through the centre of the territory. For example, the United States’ Office of the Geographer regarded the area as having only an approximate boundary rather than a precise one.

The Saudi Arabian–Iraqi neutral zone formerly had the ISO 3166-1 codes NT and NTZ. These codes were discontinued in 1993. The FIPS 10-4 code for the Saudi Arabian–Iraqi neutral zone was IY; this code was deleted in 1992.

== See also ==
- Geography of Iraq
- Geography of Saudi Arabia
- Iraq–Saudi Arabia border
- Unification of Saudi Arabia
- Saudi Arabia–United Arab Emirates border dispute
- Saudi Arabian–Kuwaiti neutral zone

== Bibliography ==
- "International Frontier Treaty Between Saudi Arabia and Iraq splitting the Neutral Zone" (PDF). UN. 1975-07-02.
