= Uqair Protocol of 1922 =

1922 agreement between Iraq, Nejd, and Kuwait

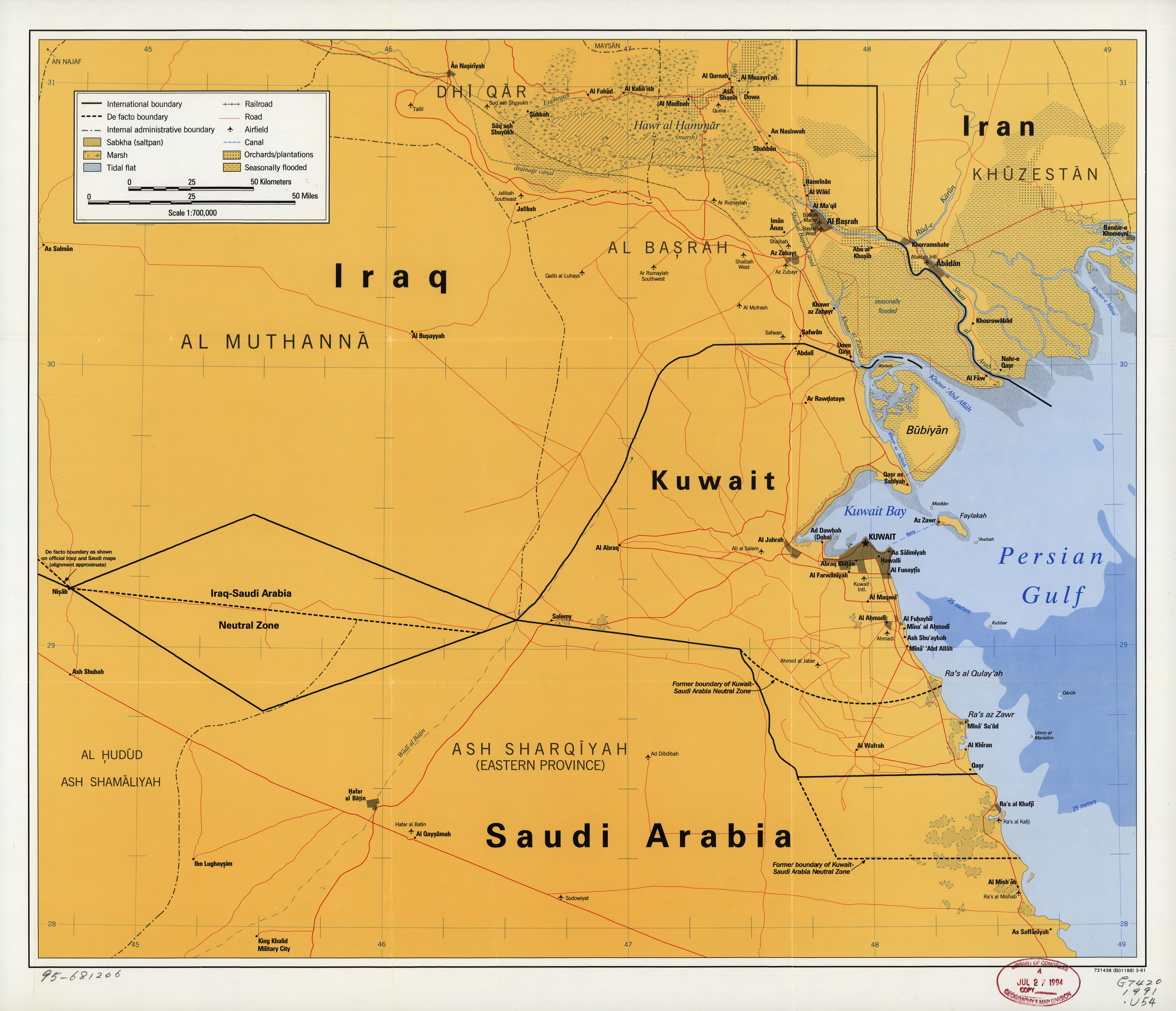
- The territory of Kuwait and the two neutral zones, west and south of Kuwait, agreed in 1922
- Signed: December 2, 1922
- Location: Uqair, Saudi Arabia
- Signatories: Percy Cox, Ibn Saud

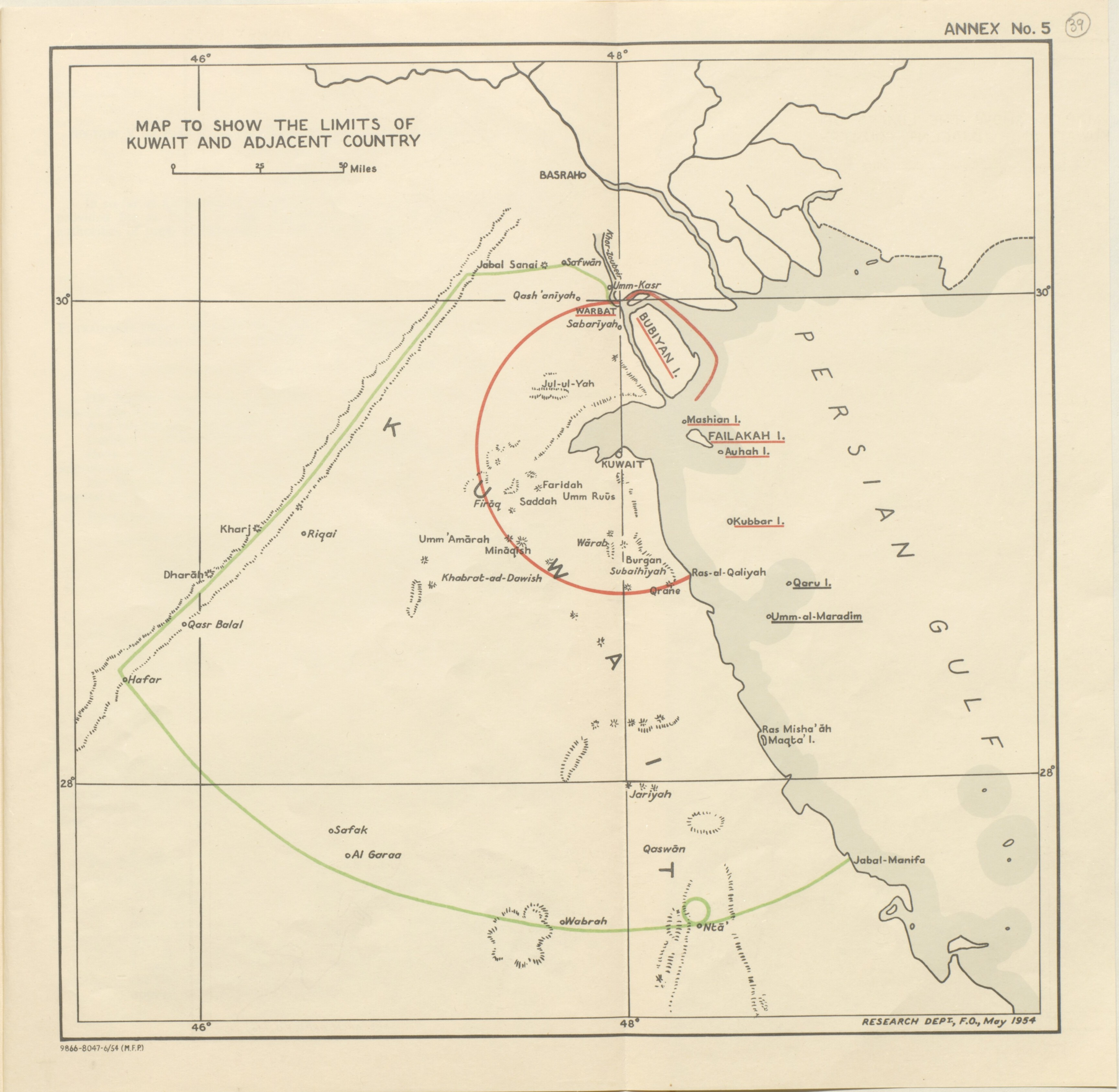
The borders of Kuwait as established after consultations between Great Britain and the Ottoman Empire in 1913

The Uqair Protocol or Uqair Convention was an agreement at Uqair on 2 December 1922 that defined the boundaries between Mandatory Iraq, the Sultanate of Nejd and Sheikhdom of Kuwait. It was made by Percy Cox, the British High Commissioner to Iraq, in response to Ikhwan raiders from Nejd under Ibn Saud attacking Kuwait. Cox met ibn Saud and Major John More, the British Political Agent to Kuwait. The boundaries included a Saudi–Iraqi neutral zone and a Saudi–Kuwaiti neutral zone.

Kuwait was not permitted any role in the outcome of the Uqair agreement when the Saudis and British decided Kuwait's modern boundaries. Kuwait lost more than two thirds of its territory as a result of the agreement, as well as its second largest town, the port of Manifa. The loss of territory made anti-British sentiment grow in Kuwait.

== History ==
A negotiation was called by the British to mediate concerns regarding Nejd attacks on Kuwait. Kuwait was not included as they were formally under British protection. Initially Saud did not wish to recognised a separate, independent Iraq. However, both Najd and Iraq agreed to the principle of there being a border with neutral zones in the Muhammarah Agreement in May 1922 with the Uqair conference being called to confirm it. At the conference, Cox managed to persuade Saud to recognise one and drew boundaries on the map with a pencil. Cox did this unilaterally in order to solve the impasse without full British government approval.

The boundaries drawn did not prove satisfactory in the region, with regular Ikhwan raids occurring in the proposed border regions. But it was eventually confirmed in 1925. Despite this, dissatisfaction with the border remained and led to conflicts in following decades. Kuwait only accepted the terms due to the threat of losing British protection, which could have potentially resulted in an absorption into the Third Saudi state.

== See also ==
- Iraq–Saudi Arabia border
- Kuwait–Saudi Arabia border
- List of Middle East peace proposals

== Bibliography ==
- Lauterpacht, E.; Greenwood, C. J.; Weller, Marc (1 June 1991). "1.6 The determination of boundaries between Iraq, Kuwait and Saudi Arabia (Najd)". The Kuwait Crisis: Basic Documents. Cambridge University Press. pp. 45–49. ISBN 978-0-521-46308-9.
