= Ikhwan raids =

Ikhwan raids may refer to several events during the Unification of Saudi Arabia campaign:

- Ikhwan's plunders on Kuwait, during the Kuwait-Najd Border War 1921
- Ikhwan's raids on Iraq 1921-1924
  - Raid on Nasiriyah 1921
  - Battle of Abi Al-Ghar 1922
  - Raid on Jaww Hadiyah 1924
- Ikhwan raids on Transjordan 1922-1924
- Raids on Iraq and Kuwait during the Ikhwan Revolt (1927–1930)
  - Ikhwan's raid on Samawah
  - Ikhwan's raid on Basra
  - Ikhwan raid on Busayya
  - Battle of Al-Regeai
