= Iraq–Saudi Arabia border =

International border

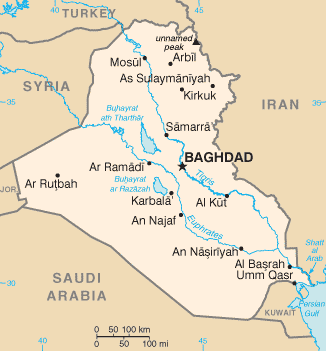
Map of Iraq, with Saudi Arabia to the south

The Iraq–Saudi Arabia border is 811 km (504 mi) in length and runs from the tripoint with Jordan in the west to the tripoint with Kuwait in the east.

== Description ==
The border starts on the west at the tripoint with Jordan, and consists of six straight lines broadly orientated to the south-east, eventually reaching the tripoint with Kuwait on the Wadi al-Batin.

== History ==
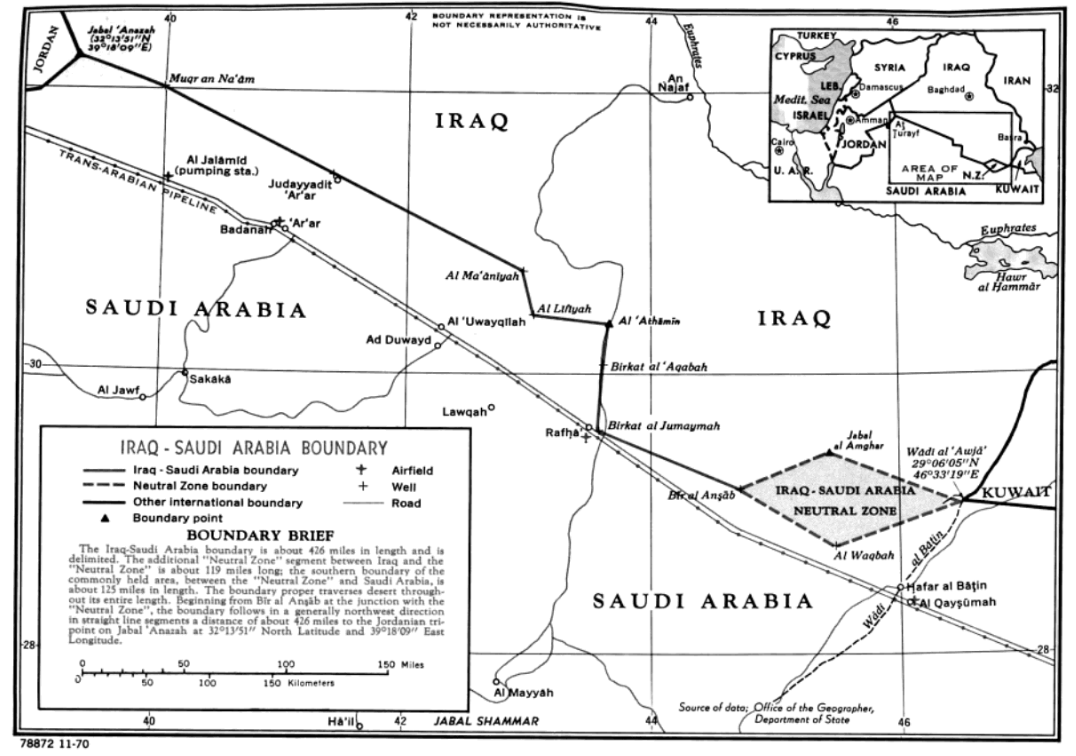
The Iraq-Saudi border, as commonly depicted prior to 1991

Historically there was no clearly defined boundary in this part of the Arabian peninsula; at the start of the 20th century the Ottoman Empire controlled Ottoman Iraq, which roughly corresponds to modern Iraq, with areas further south consisting of loosely organised Arab groupings, occasionally forming emirates, most prominent of which was the Emirate of Nejd and Hasa ruled by the al-Saud family.

During the First World War an Arab Revolt, supported by Britain, succeeded in removing the Ottomans from most of the Middle East. As a result of the secret 1916 Anglo-French Sykes-Picot Agreement Britain gained control of the Ottoman Iraqi vilayets of Mosul, Baghdad and Basra, which it organised into the mandate of Iraq in 1920. In the meantime Ibn Saud had managed to expand his domains considerably, eventually proclaiming the Kingdom of Saudi Arabia in 1932.

In December 1922 Percy Cox, British High Commissioner in Iraq, met with ibn Saud and signed the Uqair Protocol, which finalised Saudi Arabia's borders with both Kuwait and Iraq. The border thus created differed slightly from the modern frontier, with a Saudi 'kink' in the middle-south section. It also created a Saudi–Iraqi neutral zone, immediately west of Kuwait. This border was confirmed by the Bahra Agreement in November 1925.

The Saudi-Iraq neutral zone was split in 1975 and a final border treaty signed in 1981, which also appears to have 'ironed out' the Saudi kink. The details of this treaty were not revealed until 1991 when Saudi Arabia deposited the agreements at the United Nations following the Gulf War. The Gulf War seriously strained relations between the two countries; Iraq fired scud missiles into Saudi territory and also breached the Kuwait–Saudi Arabia border.

=== Barrier ===
Saudi–Iraq barrier
- Saudi Arabia–Iraq border

Site information
- Type: Border barrier
- Controlled by: Saudi Arabian Army
- Condition: Active

Site history
- Built: 2014
- Built by: Saudi Arabia
- In use: 2014–present
- Battles/wars: Iraqi Civil War (2014–2017)

In April 2006, while Iraq was experiencing a high level of sectarian violence, Saudi Arabia began to call for tenders to construct a border barrier in the form of a fence along the border in an attempt to prevent the violence in Iraq spilling over into its territory. The proposed fence would run for approximately 900 kilometres (560 mi) along Saudi Arabia's isolated northern desert border with Iraq. It was part of a larger package of fence-building to secure all of the Saudi Arabia's 6,500 km (4,039 mi) of border. It would supplement the existing 7-meter-high sand berm that runs along the border, in front of which there is an 8-km stretch of no-mans-land which is regularly swept smooth so that trespassers can be tracked.

The proposals were not implemented until September 2014, when the Iraqi Civil War had escalated following the rise of the Islamic State of Iraq and the Levant. ISIL's occupation of much of western Iraq had given it a substantial land border with Saudi Arabia to the south, and the barrier is intended to keep ISIL militants from entering Saudi Arabia. The line consists of a multi-layered fence and ditch barrier wall. The border zone includes five layers of fencing with 78 monitoring watch towers, night-vision cameras, and radar cameras, eight command centres, 10 mobile surveillance vehicles, 32 rapid-response centres, and three rapid intervention squads. The works were completed with the assistance of Airbus, a European multinational aerospace corporation. The barrier is sometimes referred to as the Great Wall of Saudi Arabia.

== Border Crossings ==
- Arar

== See also ==
- Iraq–Saudi Arabia relations
- Saudi–Iraqi neutral zone
