= Geography of Saudi Arabia =

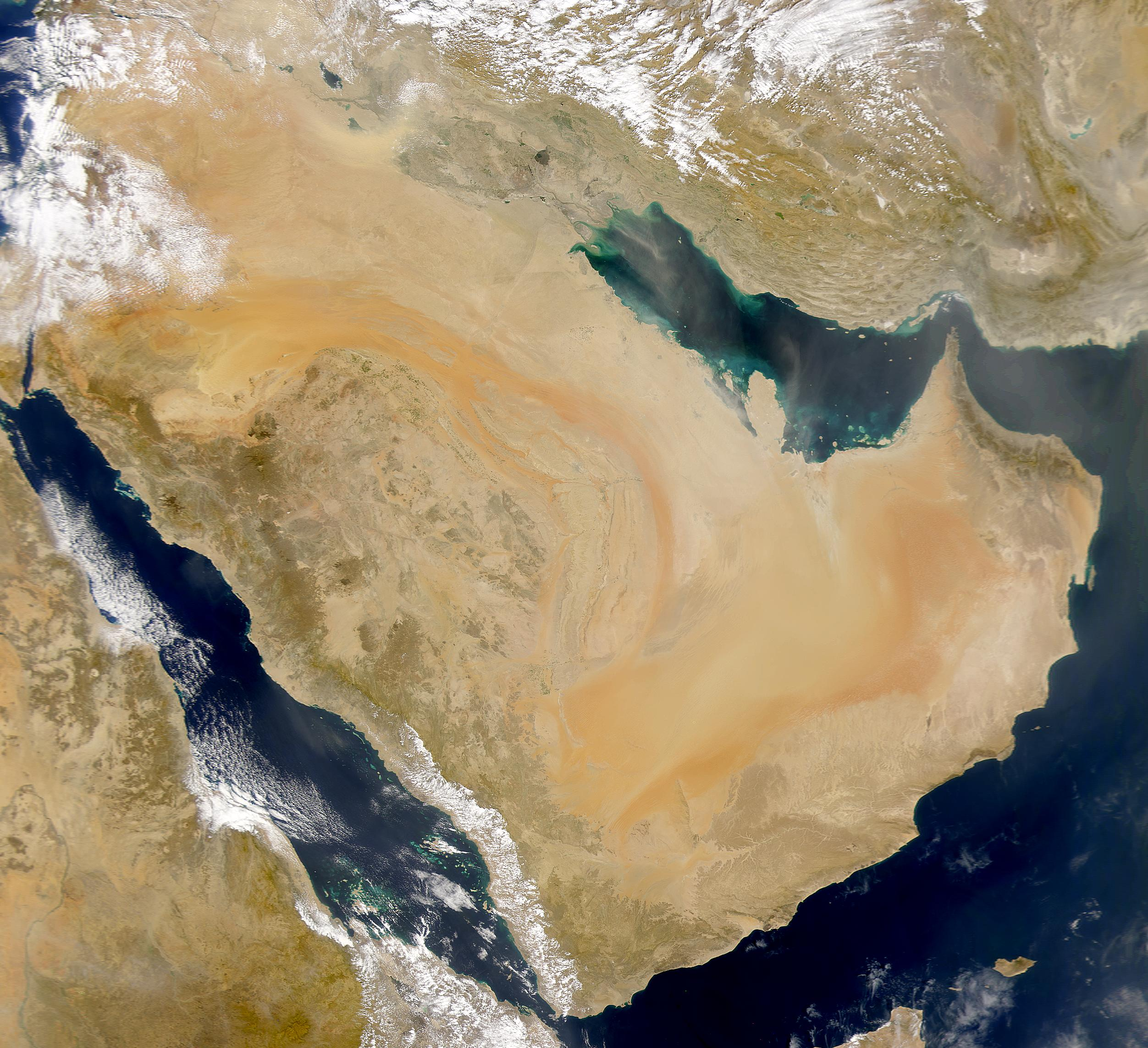
- Continent: Asia
- Region: West Asia
- Coordinates: 25°00′N 45°00′E
- Area: Ranked 12th
  - Total: 2,149,690 km^{2} (830,000 sq mi)
  - Land: 100%
  - Water: 0%
- Coastline: 2,640 km (1,640 mi)
- Borders: Total: 4,415 km (2,743 mi)
- Highest point: Jabal Soudah, 3,015 m (9,892 ft)
- Lowest point: Batn al-Tarfa −24 m (−79 ft)
- Longest river: Wadi al-Rummah; 600 km (373 mi)
- Largest lake: Al-Asfar Lake; 20,000 ha (49,421 acres)
- Climate: Most of Saudi Arabia follows a desert climate, with exceptions
- Terrain: Mostly desert covered, some mountainous areas and plains
- Natural resources: Petroleum, natural gas, fish, minerals, farming
- Natural hazards: Haze, dust storms
- Environmental issues: Desertification; depletion of ground water; lack of perennial rivers or permanent water bodies; coastal pollution from oil spills
- Exclusive economic zone: 228,633 km^{2} (88,276 mi^{2})

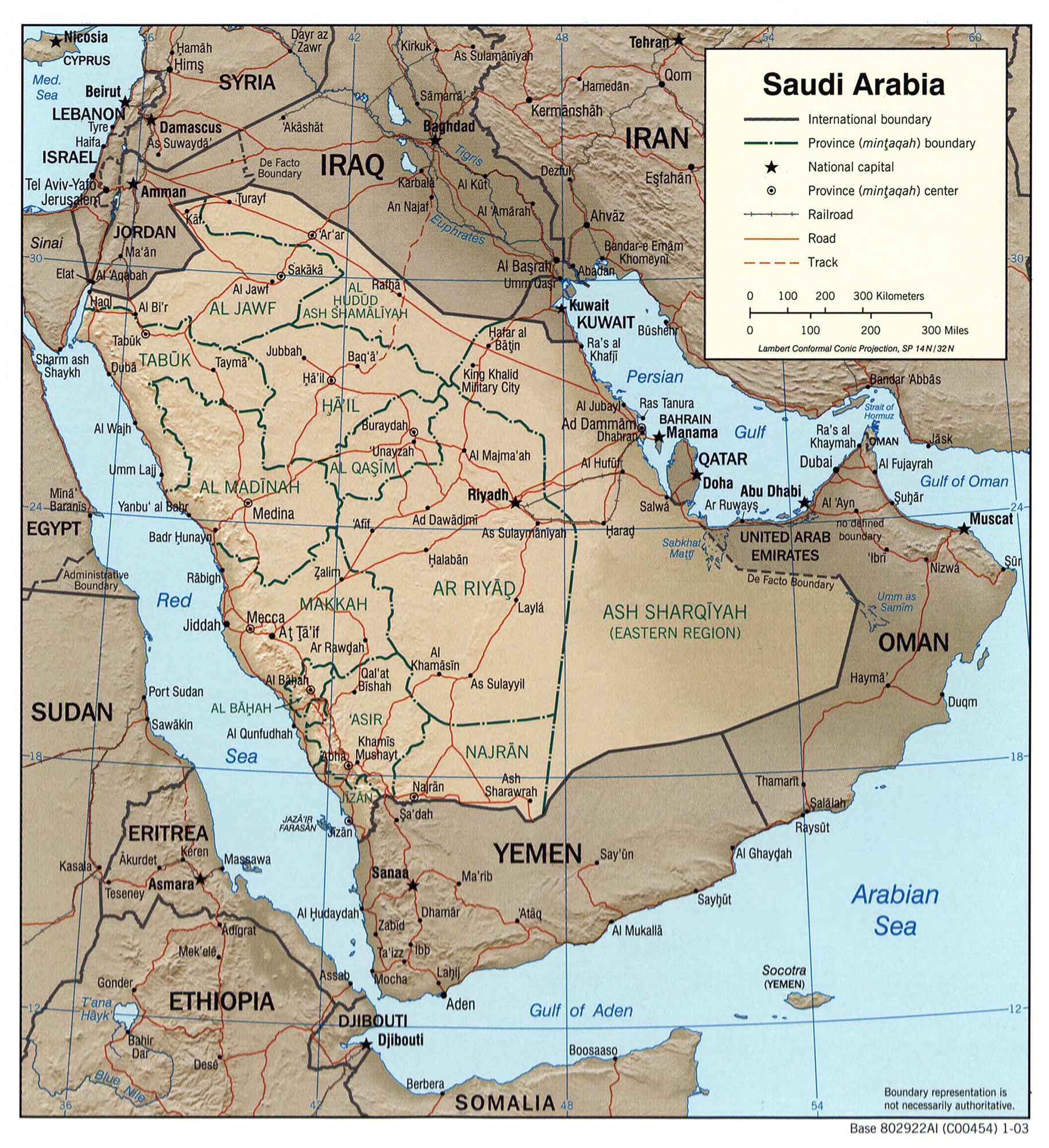
Detailed map of Saudi Arabia and its regions

Location of Saudi Arabia

Saudi Arabia is a country situated in West Asia, the largest country on the Arabian Peninsula, bordering the Persian Gulf and the Red Sea. Its extensive coastlines provide great leverage on shipping (especially crude oil) through the Persian Gulf and the Suez Canal. The country occupies 80% of the Arabian Peninsula. The Saudi government estimate is at 2,217,949 square kilometres, while other reputable estimates vary between 2,149,690 and 2,240,000 sq. kilometres. Less than 7% of the total area is suitable for cultivation, and in the early 1960s, population distribution varied greatly among the towns of the eastern and western coastal areas, the densely populated interior oases, and the vast, almost empty deserts.

== Boundaries ==
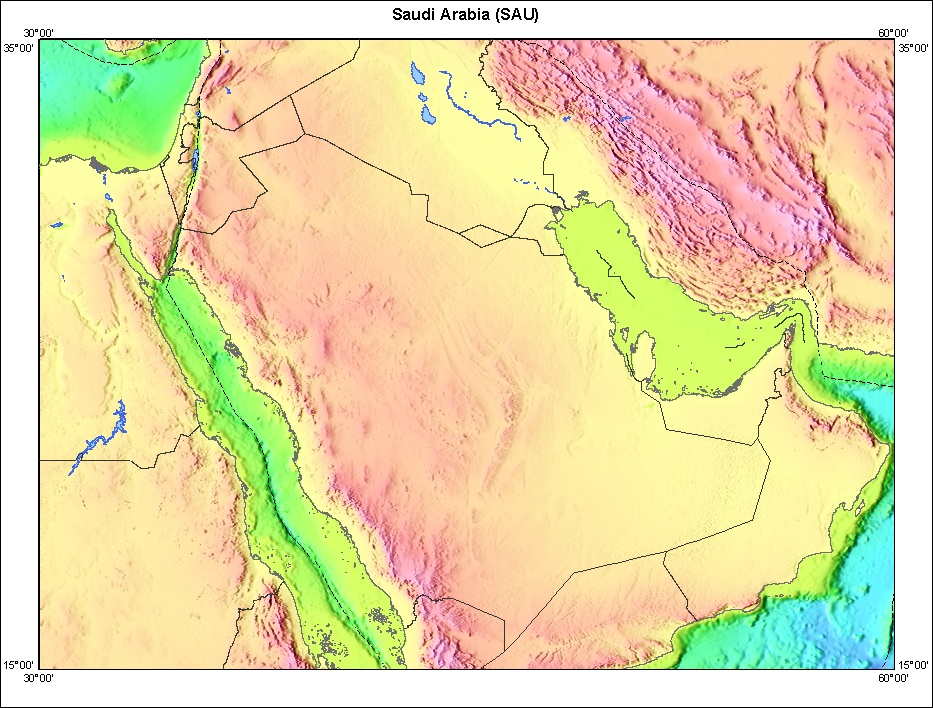
Topography of Saudi Arabia and surrounding countries

Image showing the approximate land exchanged between Jordan (gaining green) and Saudi Arabia (gaining red)

Saudi Arabia is bounded by seven countries and three bodies of water. To the west, the Gulf of Aqaba and the Red Sea form a coastal border of almost 1,800 km (1,100 mi) that extends to the southern part of Yemen and follows a mountain ridge for approximately 320 km (200 mi) to the vicinity of Najran. This section of the border with Yemen was demarcated in 1934 and is one of the few clearly defined borders with a neighbouring country. The Saudi border running southeast from Najran, however, is undetermined. The undemarcated border became an issue in the early 1990s, when oil was discovered in the area and Saudi Arabia objected to the commercial exploration by foreign companies on behalf of Yemen. In the summer of 1992, representatives of Saudi Arabia and Yemen met in Geneva to discuss settlement of the border issue.

To the north, Saudi Arabia is bounded by Jordan, Iraq, and Kuwait. The northern boundary extends almost 1,400 km (870 mi) from the Gulf of Aqaba on the west to Ras al Khafji on the Persian Gulf. In 1965, Saudi Arabia and Jordan agreed to boundary demarcations involving an exchange of areas of territory. Jordan gained 19 km (12 mi) of land on the Gulf of Aqaba and 6,000 square kilometers of territory in the interior, and 7,000 square kilometers of Jordanian-administered, landlocked territory was ceded to Saudi Arabia.

In 1922, Ibn Saud and British officials representing Iraqi interests signed the Treaty of Mohammara which established the boundary between Iraq and the future Saudi Arabia. Later that year, the Uqair Protocol signed by the two parties agreed to the creation of a diamond-shaped Saudi Arabian–Iraqi neutral zone of approximately 7,000 square kilometers, adjacent to the western tip of Kuwait, within which neither Iraq nor Saudi Arabia would build permanent dwellings or installations. The agreement was designed to safeguard water rights in the zone for Bedouin of both countries. In May 1938, Iraq and Saudi Arabia signed an additional agreement regarding the administration of the zone. Forty-three years later, Saudi Arabia and Iraq signed an agreement that defined the border between the two countries and provided for the division of the neutral zone between them. The agreement effectively dissolved this neutral zone.

The boundary between Ibn Saud's territories of Najd and the Eastern Province and the British protectorate of Kuwait was first regulated by the Al Uqair Convention in 1922. In an effort to avoid territorial disputes, another diamond-shaped Saudi–Kuwaiti neutral zone of 5,790 square kilometers directly south of Kuwait was established. In 1938 oil was discovered in Kuwait's southern Burqan fields, and both countries contracted with foreign oil companies to perform exploration work in the Divided Zone. After years of discussions, Saudi Arabia and Kuwait reached an agreement in 1965 that divided the zone geographically, with each country administering its half of the zone. The agreement guaranteed that the rights of both parties to the natural resources in the whole zone would continue to be respected after each country had annexed its half of the zone in 1966.

Saudi Arabia's eastern boundary follows the Persian Gulf from Ras 'al Khafji to the peninsula of Qatar, whose border with Saudi Arabia was determined in 1965. The border with Oman on the southeastern coast of the Arabian Peninsula runs through the Empty Quarter (Rub 'al-Khali). The border demarcation was defined by a 1990 agreement that included provisions for shared grazing rights and water rights. The border through 'Al Buraymi Oasis, located near the conjunction of the frontiers of Oman, Abu Dhabi (one of the emirates of the UAE) and Saudi Arabia, has triggered extensive dispute among the three states since the Treaty of Jeddah in 1927. In a 1975 agreement with Saudi Arabia, Abu Dhabi accepted sovereignty over six villages in the 'Al Buraymi Oasis and the sharing of the rich Zararah oil field. In return, Saudi Arabia obtained an outlet to the Persian Gulf through Abu Dhabi.

Saudi Arabia's maritime claims include a twelve-nautical-mile (22 km) territorial limit along its coasts. The country also claims many small islands as well as some seabeds and subsoils beyond the twelve-nautical-mile (22 km) limit.

Land boundaries:
total: 4,415 km
border countries: Iraq 814 km, Jordan 728 km, Kuwait 222 km, Oman 676 km, Qatar 60 km, UAE 457 km, Yemen 1,458 km

Coastline: 2,640 km

Maritime claims:
contiguous zone: 18 nmi (33.3 km; 20.7 mi)
continental shelf: not specified
territorial sea: 12 nmi (22.2 km; 13.8 mi)
exclusive economic zone: 228,633 km^{2} (88,276 mi^{2})

== Water resources ==
Until the 1980s, Saudi Arabia had lakes at Layla Aflaj and deep waterholes at 'Al-Kharj, fed by huge underground aquifers formed in prehistoric times and non-renewable. 'Al Kharj was a valuable source of drinking water in a barren terrain. In recent years, these aquifers have been drawn upon heavily, both for agricultural and domestic purposes, and no fresh water remains in the lakes or pits.

In the absence of permanent rivers or bodies of water, streams and groundwater, desalinated seawater and very scarce surface water must supply the country's needs. In eastern Arabia and in the Jabal Tuwayq, artesian wells and springs are plentiful. In al-Ahsa numerous large, deep pools are constantly replenished by artesian springs as a result of underground water from the eastern watershed of the Jabal Tuwayq. Such springs and wells permit extensive irrigation in local oases. In the Hijaz, wells are abundant, and springs are common in the mountainous areas. In Najd and the great deserts, watering places are comparatively fewer and scattered over a wide area. Water must be hoisted or pumped to the surface, and even where water is plentiful its quality may be poor.

Saudi Arabia is the third most water stressed country in the world.

Modern technology has located and increased the availability of much of the underground water. Saudi Arabian Oil Company (Saudi Aramco) technicians have determined that very deep aquifers lie in many areas of northern and eastern Arabia and that the Wasia, the largest aquifer in Saudi Arabia, contains more water than the Persian Gulf. The Saudi government, Saudi Aramco, and the United Nations (UN) Food and Agriculture Organization have made separate and joint efforts to exploit underground water resources. In the past, improperly drilled wells have reduced or destroyed any good they might have served by leaching the lands they were drilled to irrigate. Successive agricultural projects, many of which were designed primarily to encourage Bedouin settlement, have increased water resource exploitation. In the early 1990s, large-scale agricultural projects have relied primarily on such underground aquifers, which provided more than 80% of the water for agricultural requirements. In fiscal year (FY) 1987, about 90% of the total water demand in the kingdom was consumed by agriculture.

== Topography and natural regions ==
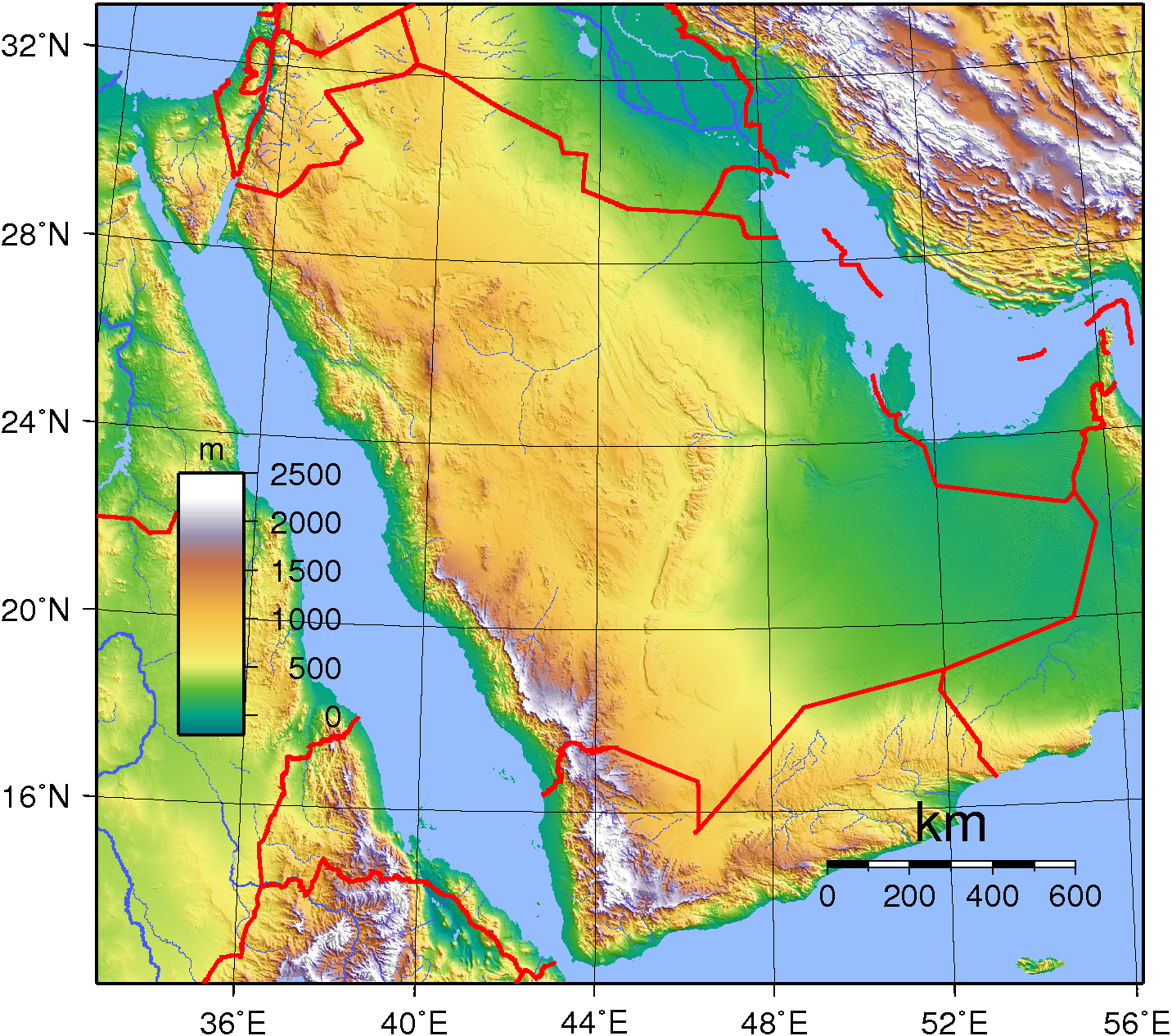
Topography of Saudi Arabia (Altitude color coded)

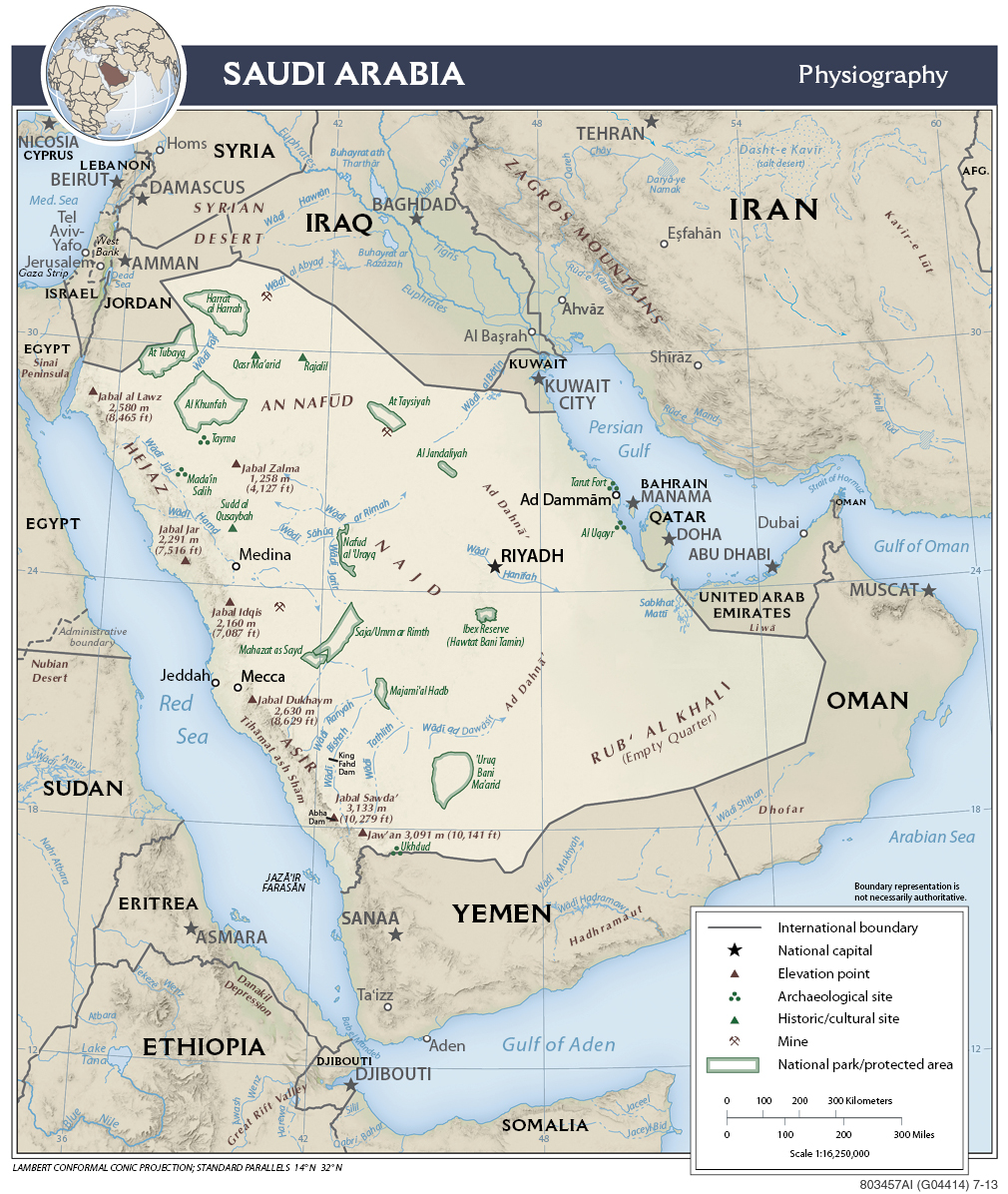
Saudi Arabia physical features

Köppen–Geiger climate classification map at 1-km resolution for Saudi Arabia (1991–2020)

The Arabian Peninsula is an ancient massif composed of stable crystalline rock whose geologic structure developed concurrently with the Alps. Geologic movements caused the entire mass to tilt eastward and the western and southern edges to tilt upward. In the valley created by the fault, called the Great Rift, the Red Sea was formed. The Great Rift runs from the Mediterranean along both sides of the Red Sea south through Ethiopia and the lake country of East Africa, gradually disappearing in the area of Mozambique, Zambia, and Zimbabwe. Scientists analyzing photographs taken by United States astronauts on the joint United States-Soviet space mission in July 1975 detected a vast fan-shaped complex of cracks and fault lines extending north and east from the Golan Heights. These fault lines are believed to be the northern and final portion of the Great Rift and are presumed to be the result of the slow rotation of the Arabian Peninsula counterclockwise in a way that will, in approximately ten million years, close off the Persian Gulf and make it a lake.

On the peninsula, the eastern line of the Great Rift fault is visible in the steep and, in places, high escarpment that parallels the Red Sea between the Gulf of Aqaba and the Gulf of Aden. The eastern slope of this escarpment is relatively gentle, dropping to the exposed shield of the ancient landmass that existed before the faulting occurred. A second lower escarpment, the Jabal Tuwayq, runs north to south through the area of Riyadh.

In the south, a coastal plain, the Tihamah, rises gradually from the sea to the mountains. Hejaz extends southward to the borders of mountainous Yemen. The central plateau, Najd, extends east to the Jabal Tuwayq and slightly beyond. A long, narrow strip of desert known as Ad Dahna separates Najd from eastern Arabia, which slopes eastward to the sandy coast along the Persian Gulf. North of Najd a larger desert, An Nafud, isolates the heart of the peninsula from the steppes of northern Arabia. South of Najd lies one of the largest sand deserts in the world, the Rub al Khali.

A recent global remote sensing analysis suggested that there were 706km² of tidal flats in Saudi Arabia, making it the 37th ranked country in terms of tidal flat area.

=== Hejaz ===
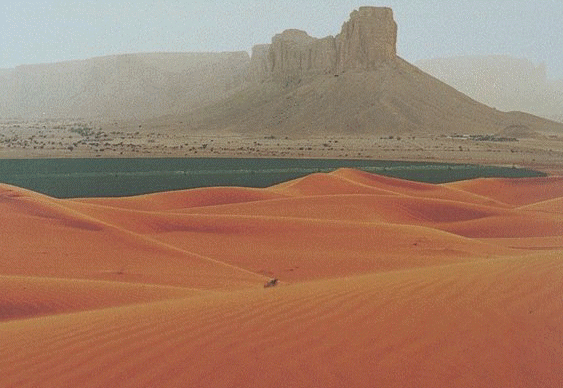
A view of the Tuwaiq escarpment from the west.

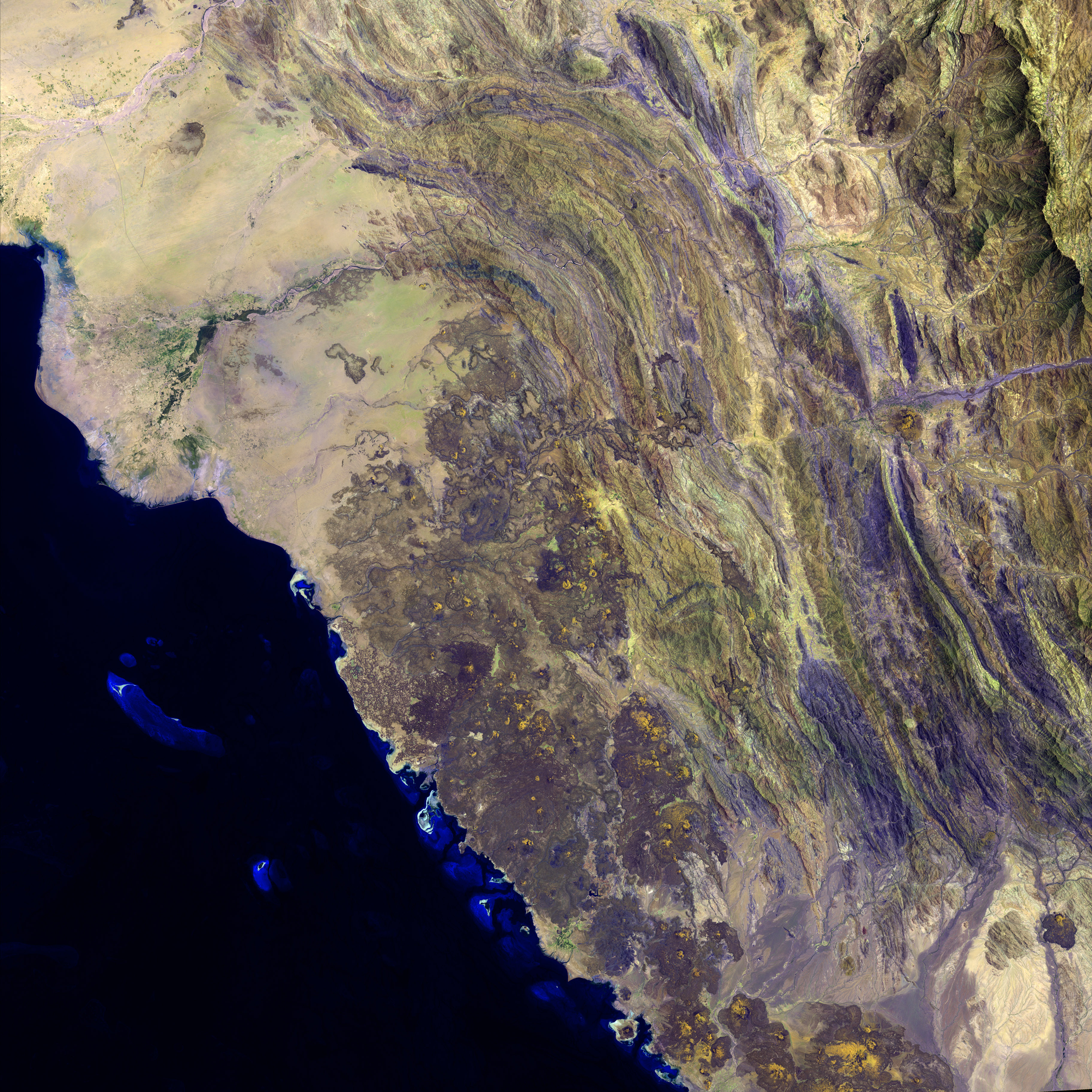
Harrat al Birk volcanic field.

The western coastal escarpment can be considered two mountain ranges separated by a gap in the vicinity of Mecca in Tihamah. The northern range in the Hejaz seldom exceeds 2,100 meters, and the elevation gradually decreases toward the south to about 600 meters. The rugged mountain wall drops abruptly to the sea with only a few intermittent coastal plains. There are virtually no natural harbors along the Red Sea. The western slopes have been stripped of soil by the erosion of infrequent, but turbulent rainfalls that have fertilized the plains to the west. The eastern slopes are less steep and are marked by dry river beds (wadis) that trace the courses of ancient rivers and continue to lead the rare rainfalls down to the plains.

Scattered oases, drawing water from springs and wells in the vicinity of the wadis, permit some agriculture. Of these oases, the largest and most important is Medina. South of Hejaz, the mountains exceed 2,400 meters in several places with some peaks nearing 3,000 meters. The eastern slope of the mountain range in Asir is gentle, melding into a plateau region that drops gradually into the Rub al Khali. Although rainfall is infrequent in this area, several fertile wadis, of which the most important are the Wadi Bishah and the Wadi Tathlith, make oasis agriculture possible on a relatively large scale.

Extensive lava fields (harrat) scar the surfaces of the plateaus east of the mountain ranges in the Hijaz and give evidence of fairly recent volcanic activity. The largest of these beds is Khaybar, north of Medina; another is Al Harrah, part of the large volcanic field Harrat Ash Shamah.

=== Tihamah ===
The rugged western face of the escarpment drops steeply to the coastal plain, the Tihamah lowlands, whose width averages 65 kilometers. Along the seacoast is a salty tidal plain of limited agricultural value, backed by potentially rich alluvial plains. The relatively well-watered and fertile upper slopes and the mountains behind are extensively terraced to allow maximum land use. This coastal plain is part of the Arabian Peninsula coastal fog desert ecoregion. Both Mecca and Jeddah lie within the northern part of Tihamah.

=== Najd ===
East of the Hejaz and Asir lies the great plateau area of Najd. This region is mainly rocky plateau interspersed by small, sandy deserts and isolated mountain clumps. The best known of the mountain groups is the Jabal Shammar, northwest of Riyadh and just south of the An Nafud. This area is the home of the pastoral Shammar tribes, which under the leadership of the Al Rashid were the most implacable foes of the Al Saud in the late 19th and early 20th centuries. Their capital was the large oasis of Ha'il, now a flourishing urban center.

Across the peninsula as a whole, the plateau slopes toward the east from an elevation of 1,360 meters in the west to 750 meters at its easternmost limit. Wadis cross the region in an eastward direction from the Red Sea escarpment toward the Persian Gulf. There is little pattern to these remains of ancient riverbeds; the most important of them are Wadi Hanifa, Wadi ar Rummah, Wadi as Surr, and Wadi ad-Dawasir.

The heart of Najd is the area of the Jabal Tuwayq, an arc-shaped ridge with a steep west face that rises between 100 and 250 meters above the plateau. Many oases exist in this area, the most important of which are Buraydah, Unayzah, Riyadh, and Al Kharj. Outside the oasis areas, Najd is sparsely populated. Large salt marshes (sabkah) are scattered throughout the area.

=== Northern Arabia ===
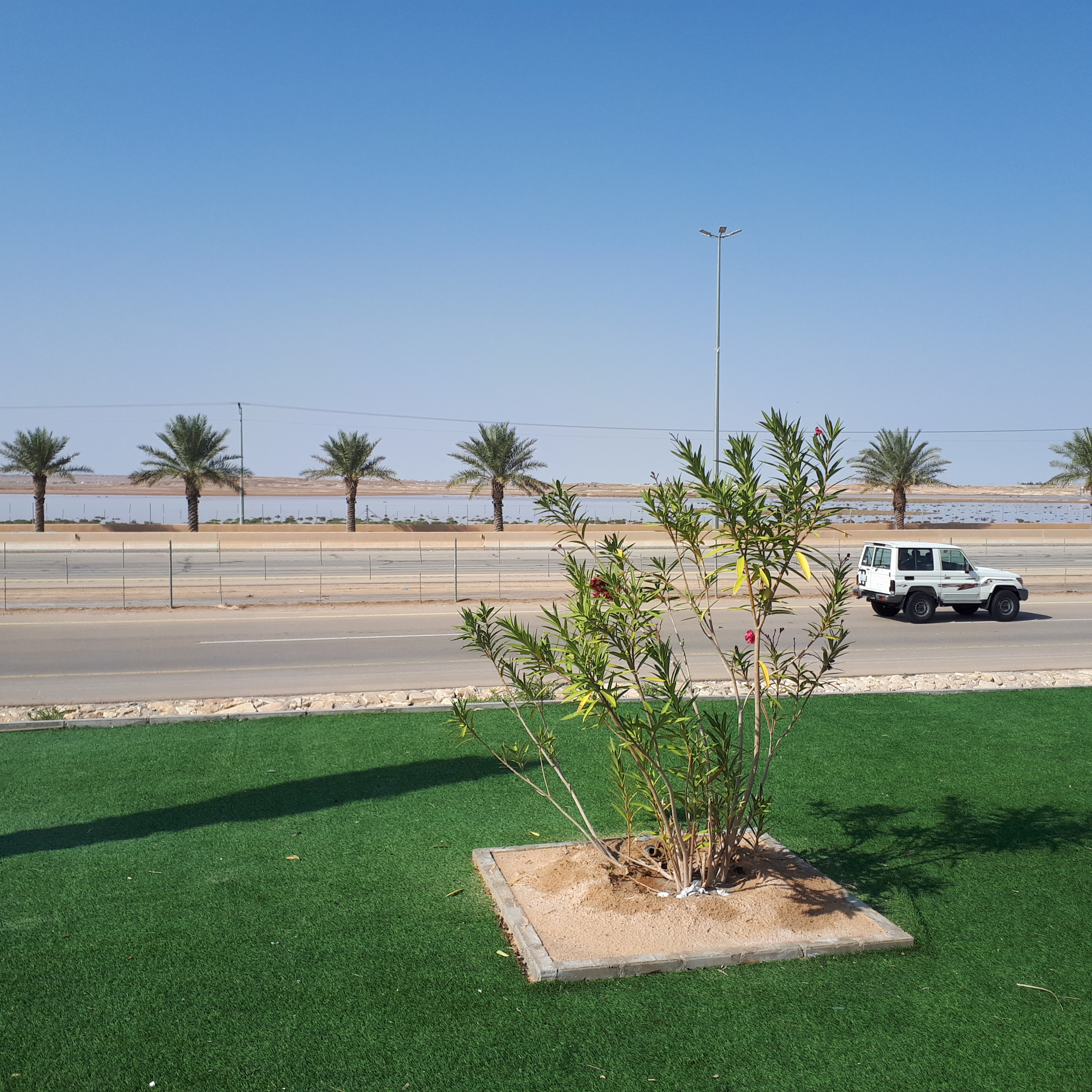
arean with shallow lakes in the Qasim region

The area north of the An Nafud is geographically part of the Syrian Desert. It is an upland plateau scored by numerous wadis, most tending northeastward toward Iraq. This area, known as Badiyat ash Sham and covered with grass and scrub vegetation, is extensively used for pasture by nomadic and seminomadic herders. The most significant feature of the area is the Wadi as Sirhan, a large basin as much as 300 meters below the surrounding plateau, which is the vestige of an ancient inland sea. For thousands of years, some of the heavily traveled caravan routes between the Mediterranean and the central and southern peninsula have passed through the Wadi as Sirhan. The most important oases in the area are Al Jawf and Sakakah, just north of the An Nafud.

=== Eastern Arabia ===
East of the Ad Dahna lies the As Summen Plateau, about 120 kilometers wide and dropping in elevation from about 400 meters in the west to about 240 meters in the east. The area is generally barren, with a highly eroded surface of ancient river gorges and isolated buttes.

Farther east the terrain changes abruptly to the flat lowlands of the coastal plain. This area, about sixty kilometers wide, is generally featureless and covered with gravel or sand. In the north is the Ad Dibdibah graveled plain and in the south the 'Al Jafurah sand desert, which reaches the gulf near Dhahran and merges with the Rub al Khali at its southern end. To the west of Sabkhat Matti and the border with the United Arab Emirates lies Batn al-Tarfa, a sabkha which contains the lowest point in the country, reaching 24 metres below sea level.

The coast is extremely irregular, merging sandy plains, marshes, and salt flats almost imperceptibly with the sea. As a result, the land surface is unstable; in places water rises almost to the surface, and the sea is shallow, with shoals and reefs extending far offshore. Only the construction of long moles at Ras Tanura has opened the Saudi coast on the gulf to seagoing tankers.

Eastern Arabia is sometimes called 'Al-Hasa or 'Al Ahsa after the great oasis, one of the more fertile areas of the country. 'Al-Hasa, the largest oasis in the country, actually comprises two neighbouring oases, including the town of Al-Hofuf.

=== Great deserts ===
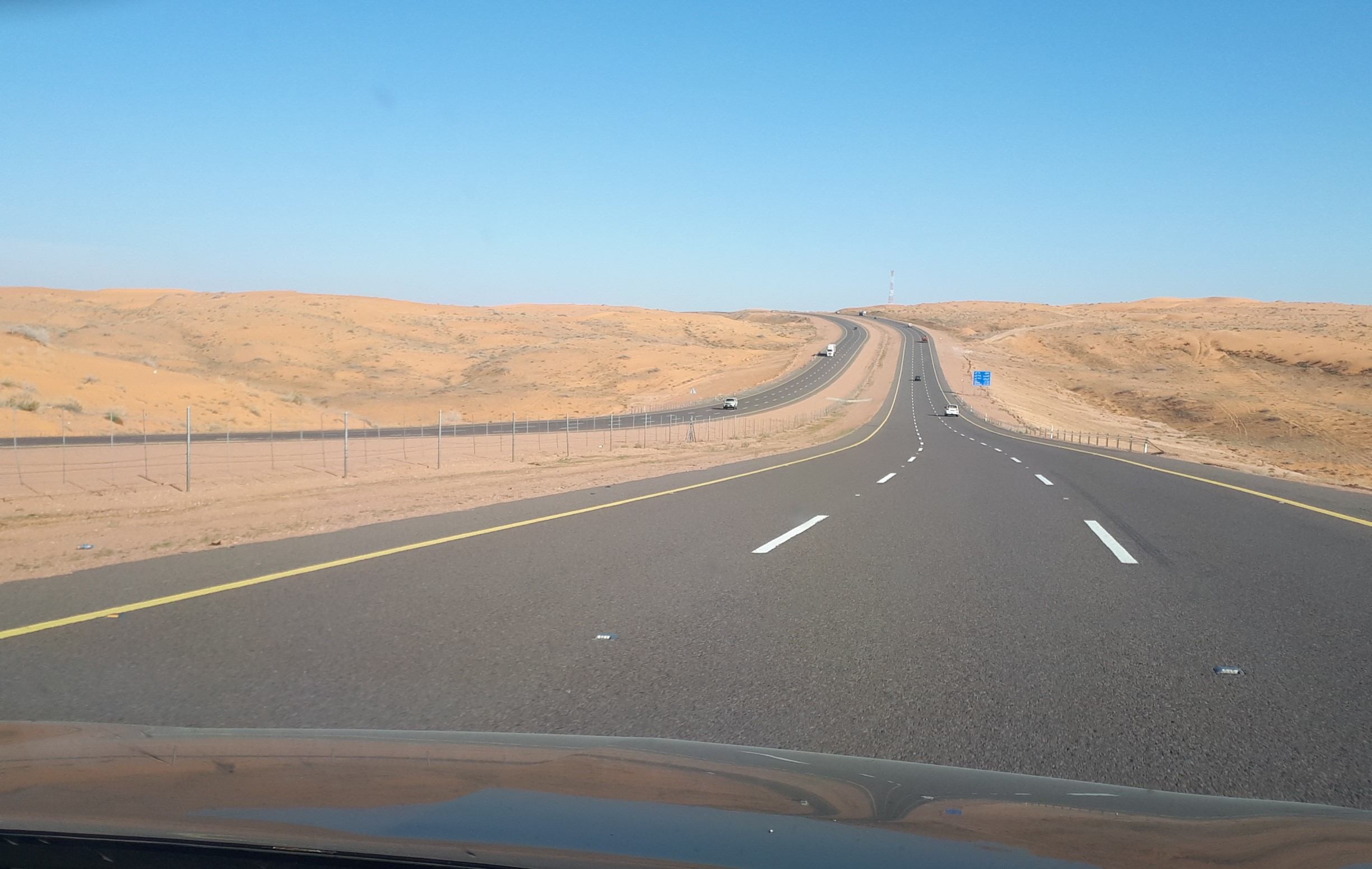
Highway crossing the Nafud desert

Three great deserts isolate the great plateau area Najd of Saudi Arabia from the north, east, and south, as the Red Sea escarpment does from the west. In the north, the An Nafud—sometimes called the Great Nafud because An Nafud is the term for desert—covers about 55,000 square kilometers at an elevation of about 1,000 meters. Longitudinal dunes—scores of kilometers in length and as much as 90 meters high and separated by valleys as much as 16 kilometers wide—characterize the An Nafud. Iron oxide gives the sand a red tint, particularly when the sun is low. Within the area are several watering places, and winter rains bring up short-lived succulent grasses that permit nomadic herding during the winter and spring.

Stretching more than 125 kilometers south from the An Nafud in a narrow arc is the Ad-Dahna Desert, a narrow band of sand mountains also called the river of sand. Like the An Nafud, its sand tends to be reddish, particularly in the north, where it shares with the An Nafud the longitudinal structure of sand dunes. The Ad Dahna furnishes the Bedouin with winter and spring pasture, although water is scarcer than in the An Nafud.

The southern portion of the Ad Dahna curves westward following the arc of the Jabal Tuwayq. At its southern end, it merges with the Rub' al Khali, one of the truly forbidding sand deserts in the world and, until the 1950s, one of the least explored. The topography of this huge area, covering more than 550,000 square kilometers, is varied. In the west, the elevation is about 600 meters, and the sand is fine and soft; in the east, the elevation drops to about 180 meters, and much of the surface is covered by relatively stable sand sheets and salt flats. In places, particularly in the east, longitudinal sand dunes prevail; elsewhere sand mountains as much as 300 meters in height form complex patterns. Most of the area is totally waterless and uninhabited except for the few wandering Bedouin tribes.

== Caves ==
Beneath the harsh deserts of Saudi Arabia lie dark chambers and complex mazes filled with crystalline structures, stalactites and stalagmites. The limestone floor of the Summan plateau, a karst area to the east of the Dahna sands, is riddled with such caves, known locally as dahls. Some have tiny entrances which open into caves, others lead into a maze of passages which can be several kilometers long. Local Bedouin have long known of these caves, and some were used as water supplies. They were first systematically studied in 1981, and later explored and reported by the Saudi Geological Survey.

== Environmental concerns ==
The Persian Gulf War of 1991 brought serious environmental damage to the region. The world's largest oil spill, estimated at as much as 8,000,000 barrels (1,300,000 m^{3}), fouled gulf waters and the coastal areas of Kuwait, Iran, and much of Saudi Arabia's Persian Gulf shoreline. In some of the sections of the Saudi coast that sustained the worst damage, sediments were found to contain 7% oil. The shallow areas affected normally provide feeding grounds for birds, and feeding and nursery areas for fish and shrimp. Because the plants and animals of the sea floor are the basis of the food chain, damage to the shoreline has consequences for the whole shallow-water ecosystem, including the multimillion-dollar Saudi fisheries industry.

The spill had a severe impact on the coastal area surrounding Madinat 'al-Jubayl as Sinaiyah, the major industrial and population center newly planned and built by the Saudi government. The spill threatened industrial facilities in 'Al Jubayl because of the seawater cooling system for primary industries and threatened the supply of potable water produced by seawater-fed desalination plants. The 'Al Jubayl community harbor and Abu Ali Island, which juts into the gulf immediately north of 'Al Jubayl, experienced the greatest pollution, with the main effect of the spill concentrated in mangrove areas and shrimp grounds. Large numbers of marine birds, such as cormorants, grebes, and auks, were killed when their plumage was coated with oil. In addition, beaches along the entire 'Al Jubayl coastline were covered with oil and tar balls.

The exploding and burning of approximately 700 oil wells in Kuwait also created staggering levels of atmospheric pollution, spewed oily soot into the surrounding areas, and produced lakes of oil in the Kuwaiti desert equal in volume to 20 times the amount of oil that poured into the gulf, or about 150,000,000 barrels (24,000,000 m^{3}). The soot from the Kuwaiti fires was found in the snows of the Himalayas and in rainfall over the southern members of the Community of Independent States, Iran, Oman, and Turkey. Residents of Riyadh reported that cars and outdoor furniture were covered daily with a coating of oily soot. Samples of soil and vegetation in Ras al Khafji in northern Saudi Arabia revealed high levels of particles of oily soot incorporated into the desert ecology. The United Nations Environment Programme warned that eating livestock that grazed within an area of 7,000 square kilometers of the fires, or 1,100 kilometers from the center of the fires, an area that included northern Saudi Arabia, posed a danger to human health.

To these two major sources of environmental damage must be added large quantities of refuse, toxic materials, and between 173 million and 207 million liters of untreated sewage in sand pits left behind by coalition forces.

Natural hazards: frequent sand and dust storms

Environment - current issues: desertification; depletion of ground water resources; the lack of perennial rivers or permanent water bodies has prompted the development of extensive seawater desalination facilities; coastal pollution from oil spills

Environment - international agreements:
party to: Climate Change, Desertification, Endangered Species, Hazardous Wastes, Law of the Sea, Ozone Layer Protection

== Statistics ==
Area:

2,250,000 km² (international borders of Saudi Arabia are not finalized. Saudi government claim large tracts of land inside the neighboring countries of Yemen, Oman and U.A.E. in addition to others. The present figure for the size of that states includes all those territories that are outside Saudi control)
Land: 2,250,000 km²
Water: 0 km²

Land use:
Arable land: 1.8%
Permanent crops: 0%
Permanent pastures: 56%
Forests and Woodland: 0%
Other: 42%

Irrigated land: 4,350 km²

== See also ==
- Saudi Arabia – United Arab Emirates border dispute
- Saudi–Kuwaiti neutral zone
- Saudi–Iraqi neutral zone
- Mountains in the Arabian Peninsula
  - List of mountains in Saudi Arabia
    - Sarat Mountains
      - Asir Mountains
      - Hijaz Mountains
      - Midian Mountains
    - Shammar Mountains
  - List of volcanoes in Saudi Arabia
- List of wadis of Saudi Arabia
- Sykes–Picot Agreement
- Winston's Hiccup
