= Al Wahbah crater =

Volcanic crater in Saudi Arabia

Coordinates: 22°54′0″N 41°8′20″E

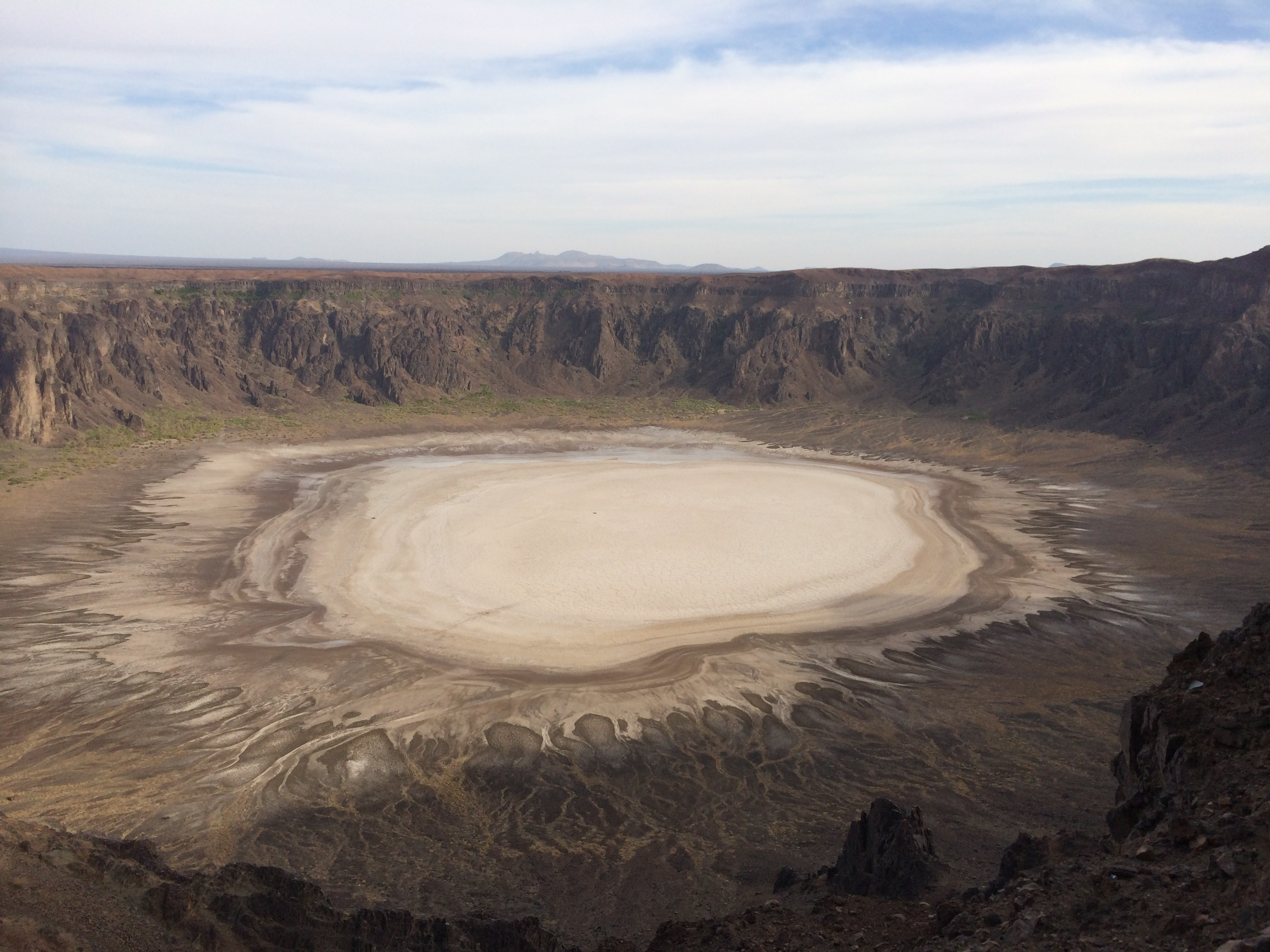
Al Wahbah crater

Panorama of Al Wahbah crater

Al Wahbah Crater (Arabic: فَوْهَة ٱلْوَعْبَة, romanized: Fawhat al-Waʿbah), also Maqlaʿ Ṭamiyyah (مَقْلَع طَمِيَّة), is a volcanic crater, which is about 250 kilometres (160 miles) away from Ta'if on the western edge of the Harrat Kishb basalt plateau in the Hejazi region of Saudi Arabia (lat. 22.90632, lon. 41.13849).

The Harrat Kishb plateau contains many volcanic cones. It is 250 m (820 ft) deep and two kilometres (1 1/4 miles) in diameter. The bottom of the crater is covered with white sodium phosphate crystals.

== Origin ==
While it was thought for some time that the crater was formed by a meteorite, as its appearance resembles that of the Barringer Crater, with its circular form and high sides, it is now commonly accepted by geologists that the crater is a maar crater, and was formed by volcanic activity in the form of an underground phreatic eruption – a massive steam explosion generated by molten basaltic magma coming into contact with subterranean water.

== Vegetation ==
The remains of date palm plantations can be found halfway down the side of the crater, but they are disused. There are springs near the plantations. It is easy to climb down from the rim to the bottom of the crater there from the north side on a prepared path, although most of the circumference has steep unclimbable cliffs. At the top of the path is a stone hut which contains rubbish and debris, and some suitable places for camping, although there are better places to camp to the south (see below). In the north of the Wahbah Crater, there is some vegetation located.

== Tourism ==
It takes a person 45–60 minutes to go to the bottom of the crater. This crater is very slippery and it is hard for people to come up to the surface. To climb back up takes approx 60–90 minutes. There is some mobile phone signal within the crater, and the site receives very few visitors, even over weekends. As of April 2017, there has been upgrades to the park. A stone wall has been erected about 1/4 to 1/3 of the crater rim from the northwest to southwest. There is a mosque at the end of the entrance road. There are also upgraded picnic shelters around the rim.

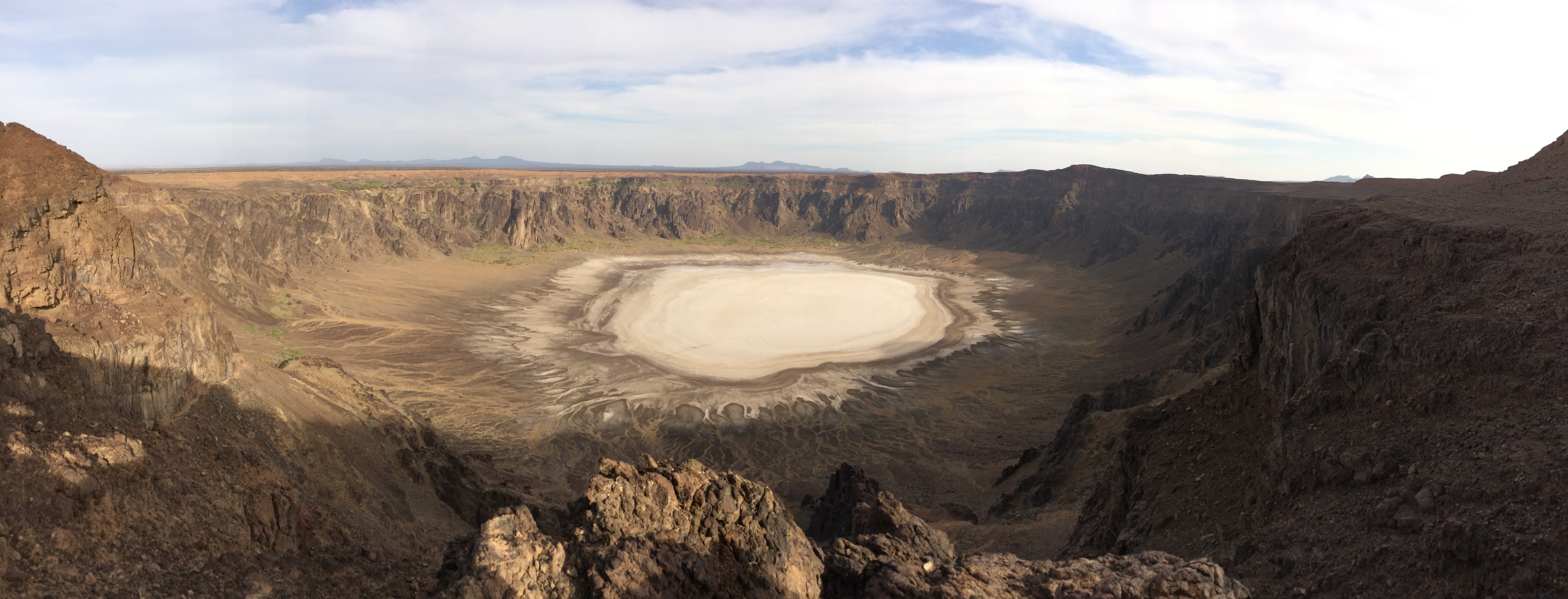
Panorama

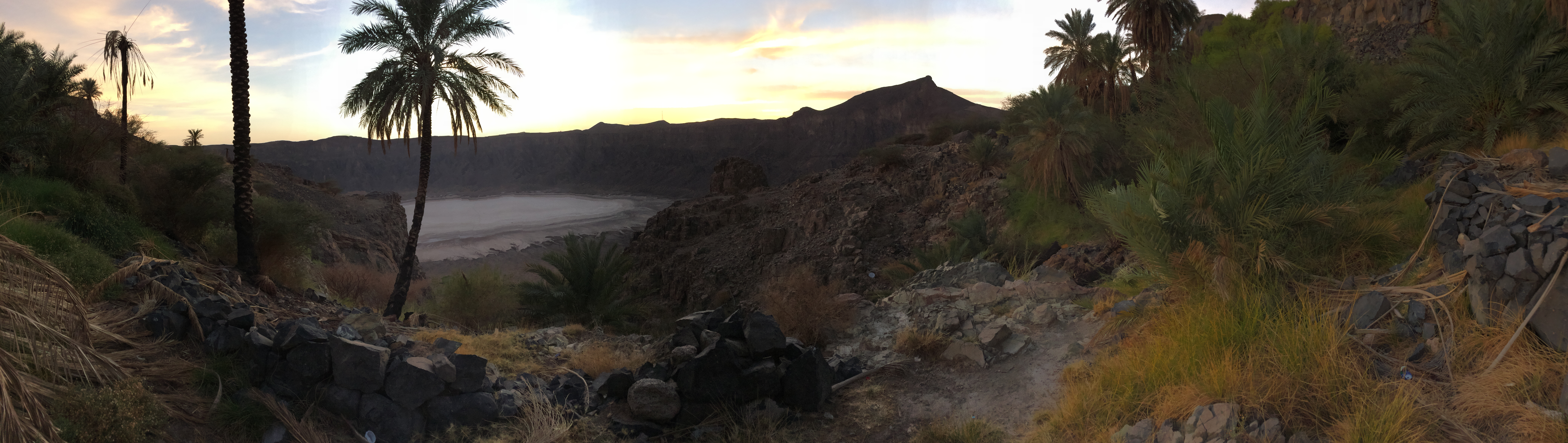
Palm trees

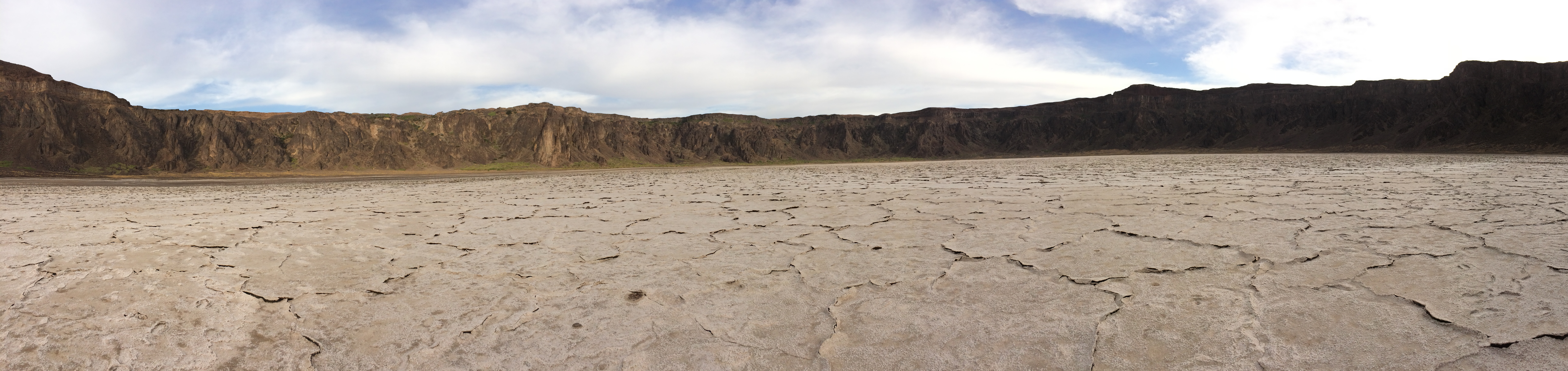
Centre of the crater

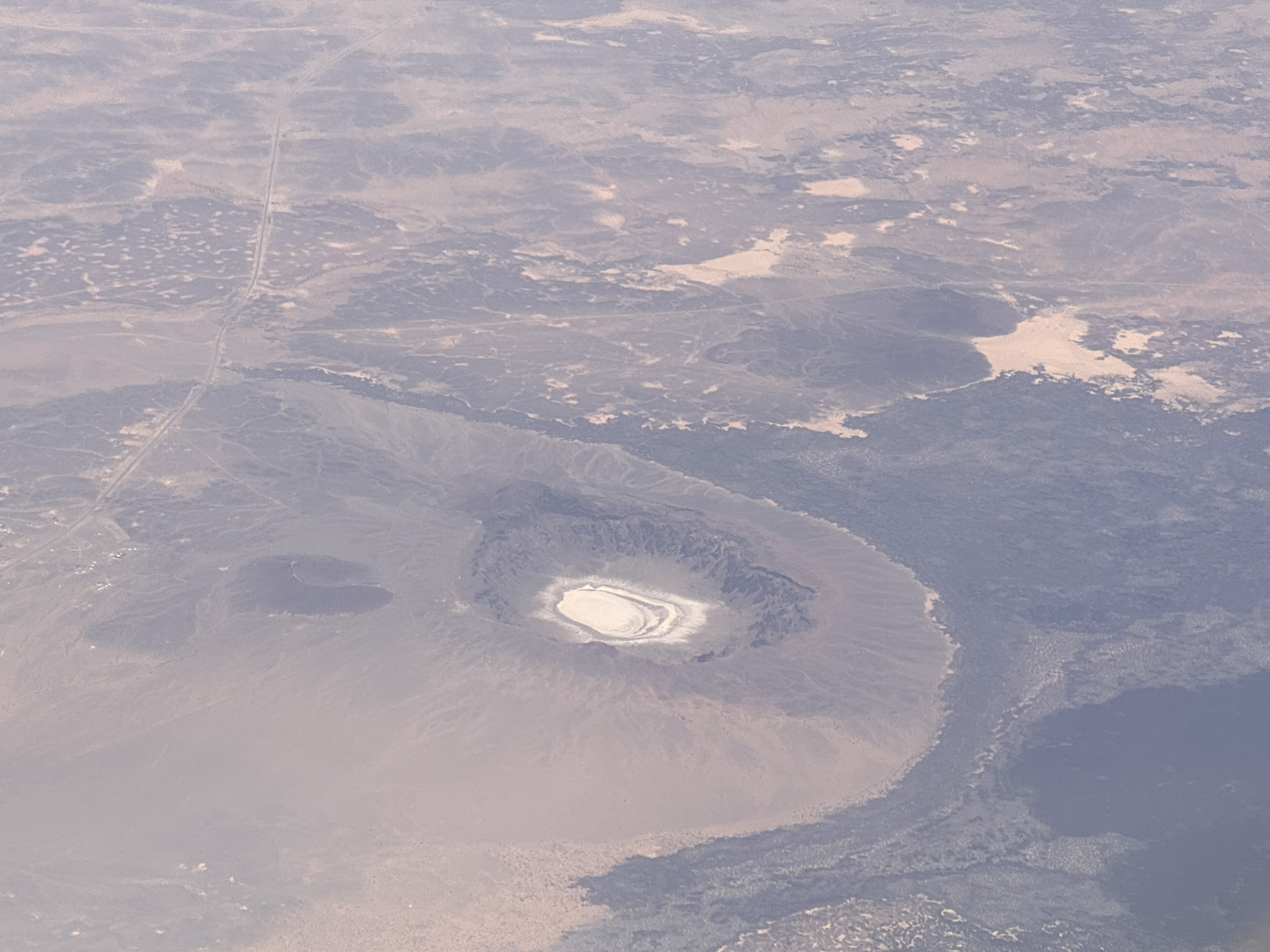
Wahbah Crater From An Airplane

== See also ==
- List of volcanoes in Saudi Arabia
- Sarat Mountains
  - Hijaz Mountains
    - Harrat Rahat
