= Qetn Mountains =

Mountain in Al-Qassim Province, Saudi Arabia

Qetn Mountain
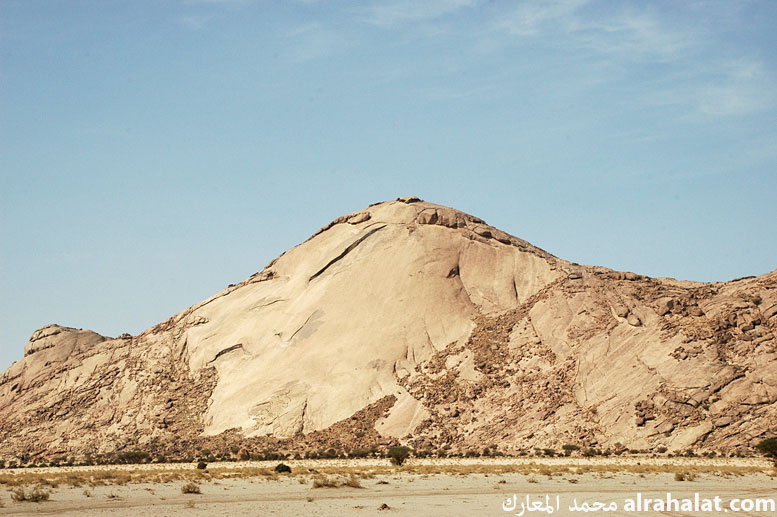

Highest point
- Coordinates: 26°1′12″N 42°18′14″E

Geography
- Location: Al-Qassim Province Saudi Arabia

26°1′3.90″N 42°18′0.43″E

Qetn Mountains is formed of a group of mountains located between Al-Qassim and Medina in Saudi Arabia. These form a circular ring that encloses a shaban full of Acacia trees. It is administratively affiliated with Aqlah Al-Suqur Governorate and is ten kilometers away from it.

== About the mountain ==
The history of Qetn extends back to the early ages of Islam, as evidenced by the statements of some historians that Qetn was contested by Abs and Asad in the early ages of Islam. It was mentioned in Al-Aboudi's Lexicon of Al-Qassim Country, where he said: "Qetn is a very red mountain because it appears red to the beholder". Qetn is located west of Al-Qassim, 170 kilometers from the city of Buraydah, and the traveler traveling from Al-Qassim to Medina will see it on his right before he reaches Aqlat al-Suqur. It was famous in the old days, so much so that Al-Hafiz said: "It is a famous mountain" and Ibn Ishaq said: "Qetn from the waters of Asad tribe in Najd".

== Population ==
The inhabitants of Qetn are the Qusayrin of Muzaynah from the tribe of Harb.

== Mentions of the mountain by geographers ==
- Abu Ishaq al-Harbi: He talks about the Basra pilgrim's route to Medina: Then they march to Al-Fawwarah and stay there, it has many water springs and palm trees, which belonged to Isa ibn Ja'far. Then they go out, and when they are six miles beyond it, Qetn appears on their right. If they pass it, the land expands and the mountains are carved out for them. If they go beyond it, the land expands and the mountains are carved out for them, that's where it's misleading. Those who go astray go to Batn al-Rumma and stay there, It has a stream that always has water, but there are no people in it.
- Al-Hamdani mentions it in his book Description of the Arabian Peninsula when he talks about the habitats of the Arabs from Bahrain and Yamama to Najd. He paired it with other mountains, saying: Darij, Al-Uthaib, Qetn, Thitel, Al-Sattar, Yathbul, and Masal are mountains.
- Ibn Abduraboh: Some of the days that took place in or near Qetn, including the day of Dhi Hassi, and Dhubyan against Abs, in order to take revenge for what happened to them on the day of Al-Murayqib. They came to Dhi Hassi, which is the valley of Safa from the land of Sharbah, and between it and Qetn is three nights.
- Ibn Abdraboh: When they met for reconciliation - i.e. Abs and Dhubyan - Abs tribe stood at Qetn, and Husayn ibn Dhammam came and met Tehan, one of the sons of Makhzum ibn Malik, and killed him with his father Dhammam. Antara ibn Shaddad had killed him at Dhi al-Muraqib, so the Abs tribe and their allies advised Nu'abdullah ibn Ghutfan and said: We will not reconcile with you until the sea has washed away its wool, and you have betrayed us many times, and the people of Abs and Dhubyan met at Qetn then, Amr ibn Al-Asla'a killed Uyayna on that day, then ambassadors traveled between them, and Khargha ibn Sinan brought his son and introduced him to Abu Tihan, he said: "This is truthfulness from your son, so he took him and was with him for a few days, then Kharja carried a hundred camels to Abu Tihan and led them to him. Then they agreed and made a covenant.
- Al-Bakri said of him in the drawing of Qatan: it's a mountain. Abu Hanifa said, "Qetn is a mountain in Najd, in the country of Asad tribe, on your right if you leave Hijaz and you are coming from Naqra". Abu Ishaq said: Qetn: One of the waters of Asad tribe in Najd, to which the Prophet Muhammad sent Aba'aslamah Ibn Abdul Asad in a squad, and Masud ibn Urwa was killed in it.

== Folk legend ==
One of the folk legends of the region's inhabitants is that Tumaya mountain is a female mountain located in the Hejaz in western Saudi Arabia in the Umm al-Dum region, (Harrat Kishb) is a reddish-black color that has fallen in love with the beautiful mountain, Qetn, which is yellowish-white in color. In her adoration of him, she flew away to where the site of its quarry is called Maqlaa Tumaya, heading to Aqlat al-Suqur. On the way, her stones were falling until she reached the Qetn area. But on her way to him, she was seen by another mountain called Akash Mountain, which was jealous of Qetn, so he shot her with a spear, knocking her to the ground before she could reach Qetn. Then he married her and gave birth to a little black-colored mountain called Dim, which is still known by that name today. Later, Qetn rode the red plateau called Albakra and rode it to Tumaya after she left Akash and separated from him.

Ibn Labboun says that the same plants that grow in Harrat Kishb are found in Tumaya mountain. These plants do not grow in the Najd region, which is why some people believe this legend.

== See also ==
- List of mountains in Saudi Arabia
