= Jabal Yar =

Volcanic field in Saudi Arabia

Highest point
- Elevation: 305 m (1,001 ft)

Naming
- Native name: جَبَل يَار (Arabic)

Geography
- Location: Saudi Arabia 17.05°N 42.83°E

Geology
- Mountain type: Volcanic field
- Last eruption: 1810 CE ± 10 years

Jabal Yār (Arabic: جَبَل يَار) is a small basaltic volcanic field in Saudi Arabia, near the border with Yemen. It is the southernmost (young) volcanic field in Saudi Arabia. The field is rich in olivine.

== Morphology ==
The field is located near the Red Sea, in the southwest of the country. The field contains three groups of volcanoes ('Ukwatain, Qummatain and Djar'attain-Harra). The area is still very active. South of Djar'attain and between it and 'Ukwatain, hot springs are present.

== Eruptions ==
The only eruption at the field took place in 1810 CE ± 10 (give or take 10 years). It was a small (VEI 2) explosive eruption that produced lava flows.

== See also ==
- List of volcanoes in Saudi Arabia
- Sarat Mountains
  - 'Asir Mountains
