= Agriculture in Saudi Arabia =

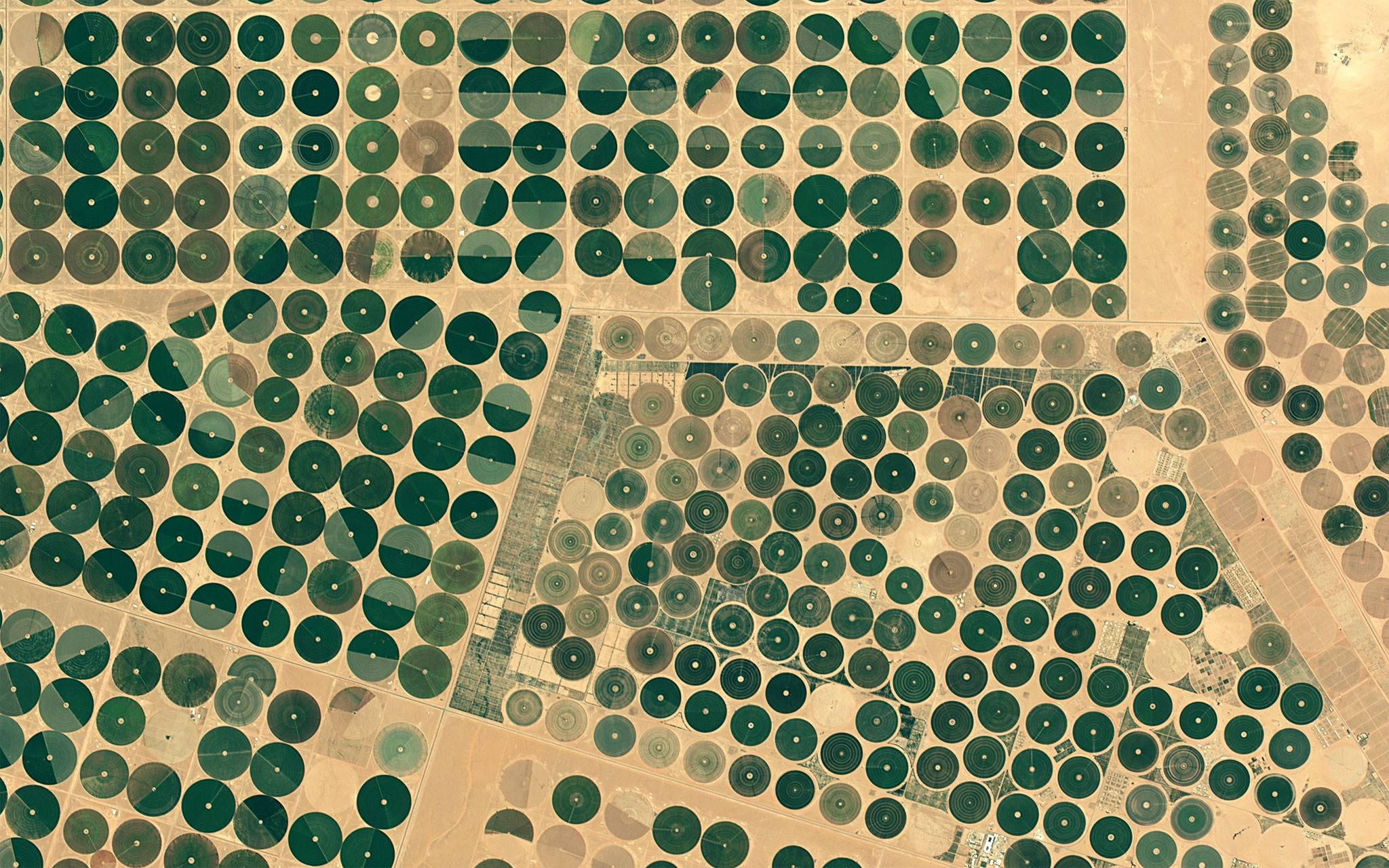
Circular irrigations in Al-Jouf Province as seen from the Hodoyoshi-1 satellite in 2015

Agriculture in Saudi Arabia is focused on the export of dates, dairy products, eggs, fish, poultry, fruits, vegetables, and flowers to markets around the world after achieving self-sufficiency in the production of such products. The government of Saudi Arabia is heavily involved in the agriculture industry and subsidizing corporate farming and the Ministry of Environment, Water and Agriculture is primarily responsible for agricultural policy. In the private sector, farmers receive long-term interest-free government loans and low-cost water, fuel, electricity, and duty-free imports of raw materials and machinery.

Although Saudi Arabia is widely thought of as a desert, it has regions suitable for agriculture. The country receives an average of 100mm of rain every winter except in the southern part of the country. The government has converted large areas of desert into agricultural fields. Major irrigation projects and large-scale mechanization has added previously barren areas to the stock of cultivatable land thanks to center-pivot irrigation.

The Food and Agriculture Organization (FAO) has cautioned that overdeveloping the agrosystem in the desert could interfere in the ecosystem of the desert.

== Production ==
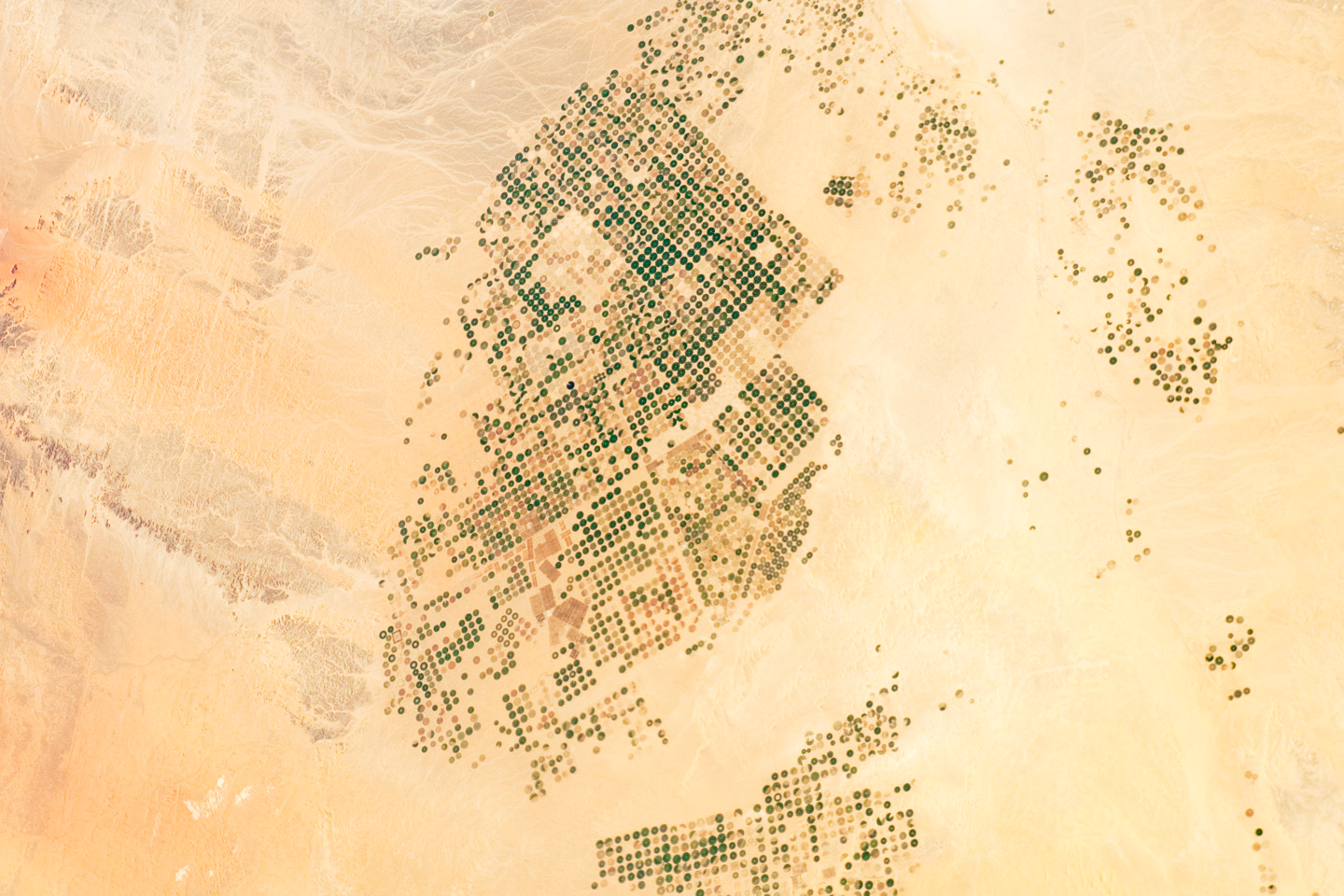
Agricultural fields in the Wadi As-Sirhan Basin of Saudi Arabia as seen from the International Space Station in 2012

In 2018, Saudi Arabia produced:

- 1,300,000 tons of date (2nd largest producer in the world, behind only Egypt);
- 634,000 tons of watermelon;
- 624,000 tons of barley;
- 586,000 tons of wheat;
- 482,000 tons of potato;
- 312,000 tons of tomato;
- 144,000 tons of sorghum;
- 115,000 tons of cucumber;

This is in addition to smaller quantities of other agricultural products, such as a few fruit orchards.

== History ==
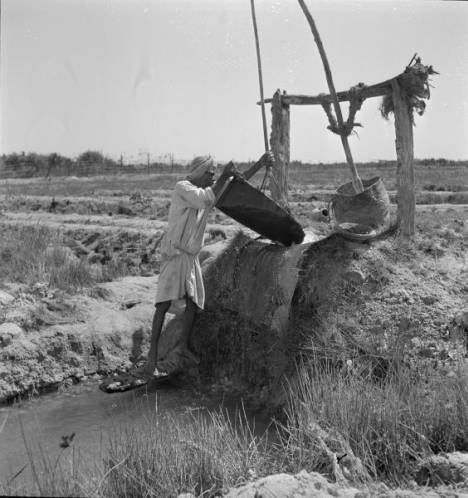
A Qatif farm worker operating a water lift in 1947

During the 1970s and 1980s, the government undertook a massive restructuring of agriculture in Saudi Arabia. The stated objectives were food security through self-sufficiency and improvement of rural incomes. Although successful in raising the domestic output of several important crops and foodstuffs through the introduction of modern agricultural techniques, the agricultural development program has not entirely achieved these objectives. In regards to self-sufficiency, the kingdom produced a limited surplus, sufficient to export some quantities of food. However, if the entire production process were considered, the import of fertilizers, equipment, and labor have made the Kingdom even more dependent on foreign inputs to bring food to the average Saudi household.

Two patterns of income distribution emerged: traditional agricultural regions did not benefit from the development program, and the government's financial support led to the establishment of large-scale agricultural production units. Some of these were managed and operated by foreign entities and owned by wealthy individuals and large businesses. From an environmental viewpoint, the program had a less than satisfactory impact. Not only has it caused a serious drain on the kingdom's water resources, drawing mainly from non-renewable aquifers, but it has also required the use of massive amounts of chemical fertilizers to boost yields. In 1992 Saudi agricultural strategy was only sustainable as long as the government maintained a high level of direct and indirect subsidies, a drain on its budget and external accounts.

The contribution of agriculture to the gross domestic product (GDP) in 1984 was 3.3%. In 2001, it increased to 5.1%, but it was due to decline in oil revenues.

== Traditional agriculture and pastoral nomadism ==
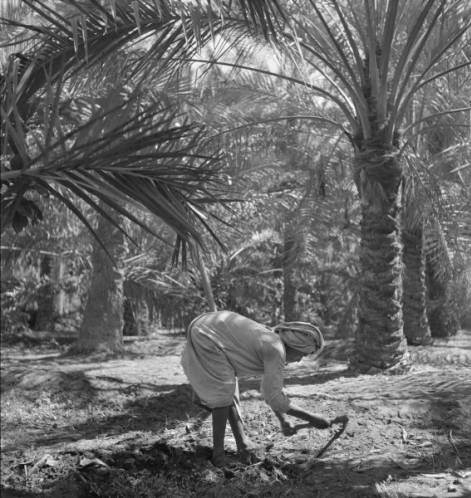
A Qatif farm worker planting date palms in 1947

In the past, the bulk of agricultural production was concentrated in a few limited areas. The produce was largely retained by these communities although some surplus was sold to the cities. Nomads played a crucial role in this regard, shipping foods and other goods between the widely dispersed agricultural areas. Livestock rearing was shared between the sedentary communities and nomads, who also used it to supplement their precarious livelihoods.

The water supply in Saudi Arabia, and specifically the lack of water has always been the major constraint on agriculture and the determining factor on where cultivation occurred. The kingdom has no natural rivers. Rainfall is slight and irregular over most of the country. Only in the southwest, in the mountains of 'Asir, close to the Yemen border and accounting for three percent of the land area, was rainfall sufficient to support regular crops. This region plus the southern Tihamah coastal plains sustained subsistence farming. Cropping in the rest of the country was scattered and dependent on irrigation. Along the western coast and in the western highlands, groundwater from wells and springs provided adequate water for self-supporting farms and, to some extent, for commercial production. Moving east, in the central and northern parts of the interior, Najd and An Nafud, some groundwater allowed limited farming. The Eastern Province supported the most extensive plantation economy. The major oasis centered around Al Hasa enjoys high water tables, natural springs, and relatively good soils, and can even produce rice.

Historically, the limited arable land and the near absence of grassland forced those raising livestock into a nomadic pattern to take advantage of what forage was available. Only in summer, the year's driest time, did the nomad keep his animals around an oasis or well for water and forage. The Bedouin developed special skills knowing where rain had fallen and forage was available to feed their animals and where they could find water en route to various forage areas.

Traditionally, the Bedouin were not self-sufficient but needed some food and materials from agricultural settlements. The near constant movement required to feed their animals limited other activities, such as weaving. The settled farmers and traders needed the nomads to tend camels. Nomads would graze and breed animals belonging to sedentary farmers in return for portions of the farmers' produce. Bedouin groups contracted to provide protection to the agricultural and market areas they frequented in return for such provisions as dates, cloth, and equipment. Bedouin further supplemented their income by taxing caravans for passage and protection through their territory.

Bedouin themselves needed protection. Operating in small independent groups of a few households, they were vulnerable to raids by other nomads and therefore formed larger groups, such as tribes. The tribe was responsible for avenging attacks on any of its members. Tribes established territories that they defended vigorously. Within the tribal area, wells and springs were found and developed. Generally, the developers of a water source, such as a well, retained rights to it unless they abandoned it. This system created problems for nomads because many years might elapse between visits to a well they had dug. If people from another tribe just used the well, the first tribe could frequently establish that the well was in territory where they had primary rights; but if another tribe improved the well, primary rights became difficult to establish. By the early twentieth century, control over land, water rights, and intertribal and intratribal relationships were highly developed and complex.

== Modern agriculture ==
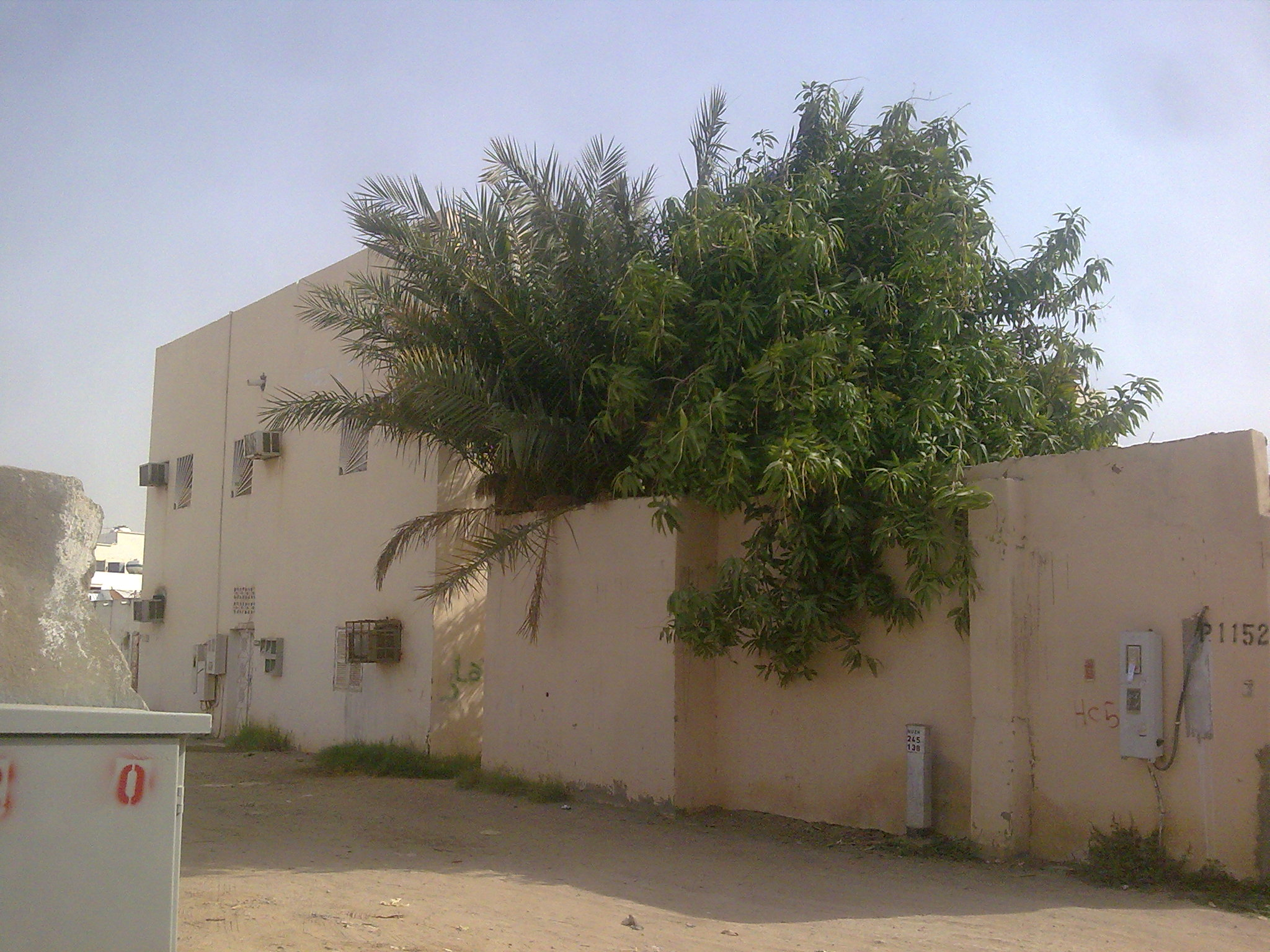
A mango tree in Jeddah

Nomadic pastoralism declined as a result of several political and economic forces. Sedentarization was a means of imposing political control over various tribal groupings in the Arabian Peninsula. New legal structures such as the 1968 Public Lands Distribution Ordinance created novel land relations and spurred the dissolution of the Bedouin way of life. The establishment of an activist modern state provided incentives for large numbers of Saudi citizens to enter the regular, wage-based, or urban commercial employment. Moreover, modern technology and new transport networks undermined the primitive services that the Bedouin offered the rest of the economy.

Until the 1970s, sedentary agriculture saw few changes and declined in the face of foreign imports, urban drift, and lack of investment. The use of modern inputs remained relatively limited. Introduction of mechanical pumping in certain areas led to a modest level of commercial production, usually in locations close to urban centers. Nevertheless, regional distribution of agricultural activity remained relatively unchanged, as did the average holding size and patterns of cultivation.

During the late 1970s and early 1980s, the government undertook a multifaceted program to modernize and commercialize agriculture, in order to improve the nation's agricultural industry. Indirect support involved substantial expenditures on infrastructure, which included electricity supply, irrigation, drainage, secondary road systems and other transportation facilities for distributing and marketing produce. Land distribution was also an integral part of the program. The 1968 Public Lands Distribution Ordinance allocated 5 to 100 hectares of fallow land to individuals at no cost, up to 400 hectares to companies and organizations, and a limit of 4,000 hectares for special projects. The beneficiaries were required to develop a minimum of 25 percent of the land within a set period of time (usually two to five years); thereafter, full ownership was transferred. In FY 1989, the total area distributed stood at more than 1.5 million hectares. Of this total area 7,273 special agricultural projects accounted for just under 860,000 hectares, or 56.5 percent; 67,686 individuals received just under 400,000 hectares or 26.3 percent; 17 agricultural companies received slightly over 260,000 hectares, or 17.2 percent. Judging from these statistics, the average fallow land plot given to individuals was 5.9 hectares, 118 hectares to projects, and 15,375 hectares to companies, the latter being well over the limit of 400 hectares specified in the original plans.

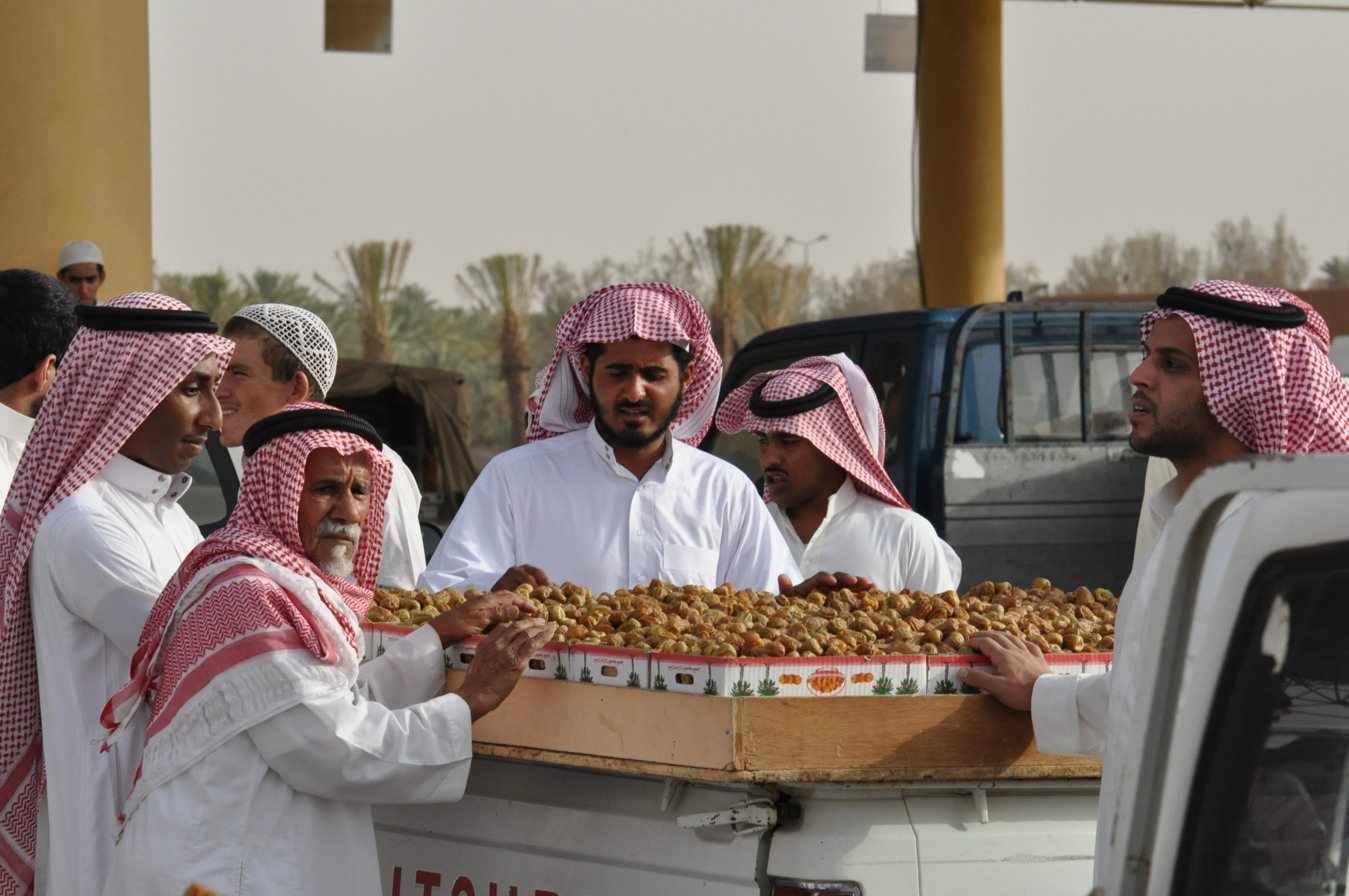
Dates in the market in Buraydah

The government also mobilized substantial financial resources to support the raising of crops and livestock during the 1970s and 1980s. The main institutions involved were the Ministry of Agriculture and Water, the Saudi Arabian Agricultural Bank (SAAB) and the Grain Silos and Flour Mills Organization (GSFMO). SAAB provided interest-free loans to farmers; during FY 1989, for example, 26.6 percent of loans were for well drilling and casing, 23 percent for agricultural projects, and the balance for the purchase of farm machinery, pumps, and irrigation equipment. SAAB also provided subsidies for buying other capital inputs.

GSFMO implemented the official procurement program, purchasing locally produced wheat and barley at guaranteed prices for domestic sales and exports. The procurement price was steadily reduced during the 1980s because of massive overproduction and for budgetary reasons, but it was substantially higher than international prices. By the late 1980s, the procurement price for wheat, for example, was three times the international price. Although quantity restrictions were implemented to limit procurement, pressures from a growing farm lobby led to ceiling-price waivers. Moreover, the government encountered considerable fraud with imports being passed off as domestic production. To control this situation, the government has granted import monopolies for some agricultural products to the GSFMO, while procurement and import subsidies on certain crops have been shifted to encourage a more diversified production program. Finally, agricultural and water authorities provided massive subsidies in the form of low-cost desalinated water, and electric companies were required to supply power at reduced charges.

The program prompted a huge response from the private sector, with average annual growth rates well above those programmed. These growth rates were underpinned by a rapid increase in land brought under cultivation and agricultural production. Private investments went mainly into expanding the area planted for wheat. Between 1983 and 1990, the average annual increase of new land brought under wheat cultivation rose by 14 percent. A 35 percent increase in yields per ton during this period further boosted wheat output; total production rose from 1.4 million tons per year in FY 1983 to 3.5 million tons in FY 1989. To put the sheer volume in perspective, exports were lifted to the point where Saudi Arabia was the sixth largest wheat exporter in the early 1990s.

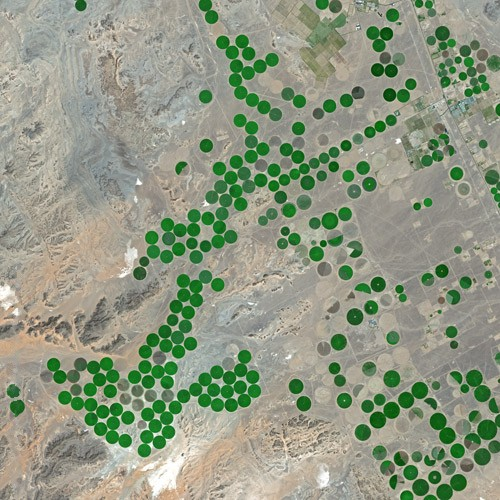
Farmlands in Tabuk Province, 2003.

The kingdom's most dramatic agricultural accomplishment, noted worldwide, was its rapid transformation from importer to exporter of wheat. In 1978, the country built its first grain silos. By 1984, it had become self-sufficient in wheat. Shortly thereafter, Saudi Arabia began exporting wheat to some 30 countries, including China and the former Soviet Union, and in the major producing areas of Tabuk, Hail, and Qasim, average yields reached 8.1 tonnes per hectare (3.6 short ton/acre). As of 2016, in the interest of preserving precious water resources, domestic production of wheat ended. The kingdom has, however, stepped up fruit and vegetable production, by improving both agricultural techniques and the roads that link farmers with urban consumers. Saudi Arabia is a major exporter of fruits and vegetables to its neighbours. Among its most productive crops are watermelon, grapes, citrus fruits, onions, squash, and tomatoes. At Jizan in the country's well-watered southwest, the Al-Hikmah Research Station is producing tropical fruits including pineapples, paw-paws, bananas, mangoes, and guavas.

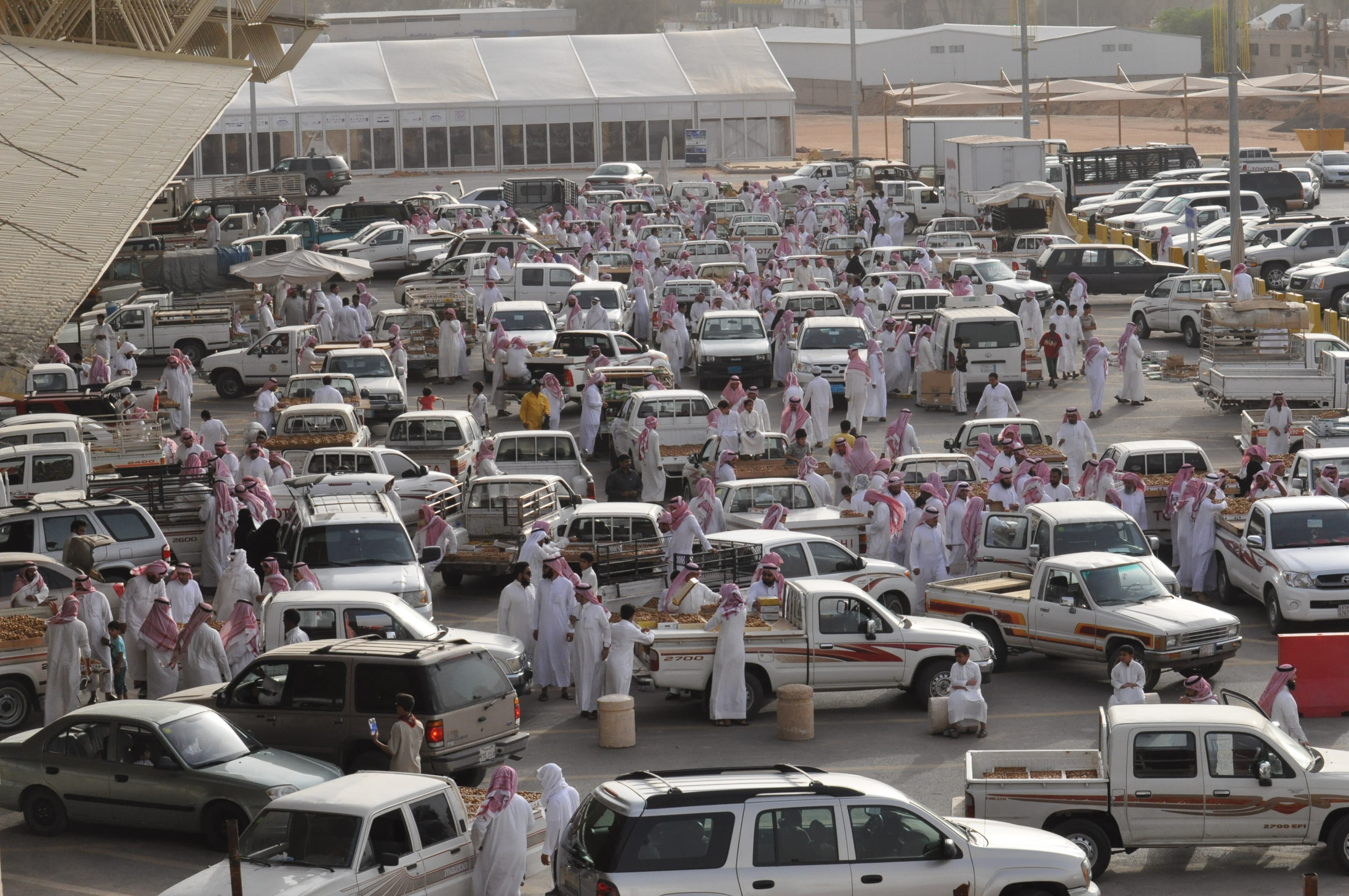
Open date market in Buraydah

Other food grains also benefited from private investment. For example, output growth rates for sorghum and barley accelerated even faster than wheat during the 1980s, although the overall amount produced was much smaller. During the 1980s, farmers also experimented with new varieties of vegetables and fruits but with only modest success. More traditional crops, like onions and dates, did not fare as well and their output declined or remained flat.

In 2018, the Saudi Ministry of Environment, Water and Agriculture adopted a new plan that aims at boosting organic farming in the country. The aim of the plan is to increase organic agricultural by 300 percent and the allocated budget is US$200 million.

In the 1970s, increasing incomes in urban areas stimulated the demand for meat and dairy products, but by the early 1980s government programs were only partially successful in increasing domestic production. Bedouin continued to raise a large number of sheep and goats. Payments for increased flocks, however, had not resulted in a proportionate increase of animals for slaughter. Some commercial feedlots for sheep and cattle had been established as well as a few modern ranches, but by the early 1980s, much of the meat consumed was imported. Although the meat supply was still largely imported in the early 1990s, domestic production of meat had grown by 33 percent between 1984 and 1990, from 101,000 tons to 134,000 tons. This increase, however, masked the dominant role of traditional farms in supplying meat. Although new projects accounted for some of the rapid growth during the 1980s, a sharp decline of roughly 74 percent in beef stock production by specialized projects during 1989 resulted in only a 15 percent fall in meat output. This reversal also highlighted the problems in introducing modern commercial livestock-rearing techniques to the Kingdom.

Commercial poultry farms, however, greatly benefited from government incentives and grew rapidly during the 1980s. Chickens were usually raised in controlled climatic conditions. Despite the doubling of output, as a result of the rapid rise in chicken consumption, which had become a major staple of the Saudi diet, domestic production constituted less than half of total demand. Egg production also increased rapidly during the 1980s. The numbers of broiler chickens increased from 143 million in 1984 to 270 million in 1990, while production of eggs increased from 1,852 million in 1984 to 2,059 million in 1990.

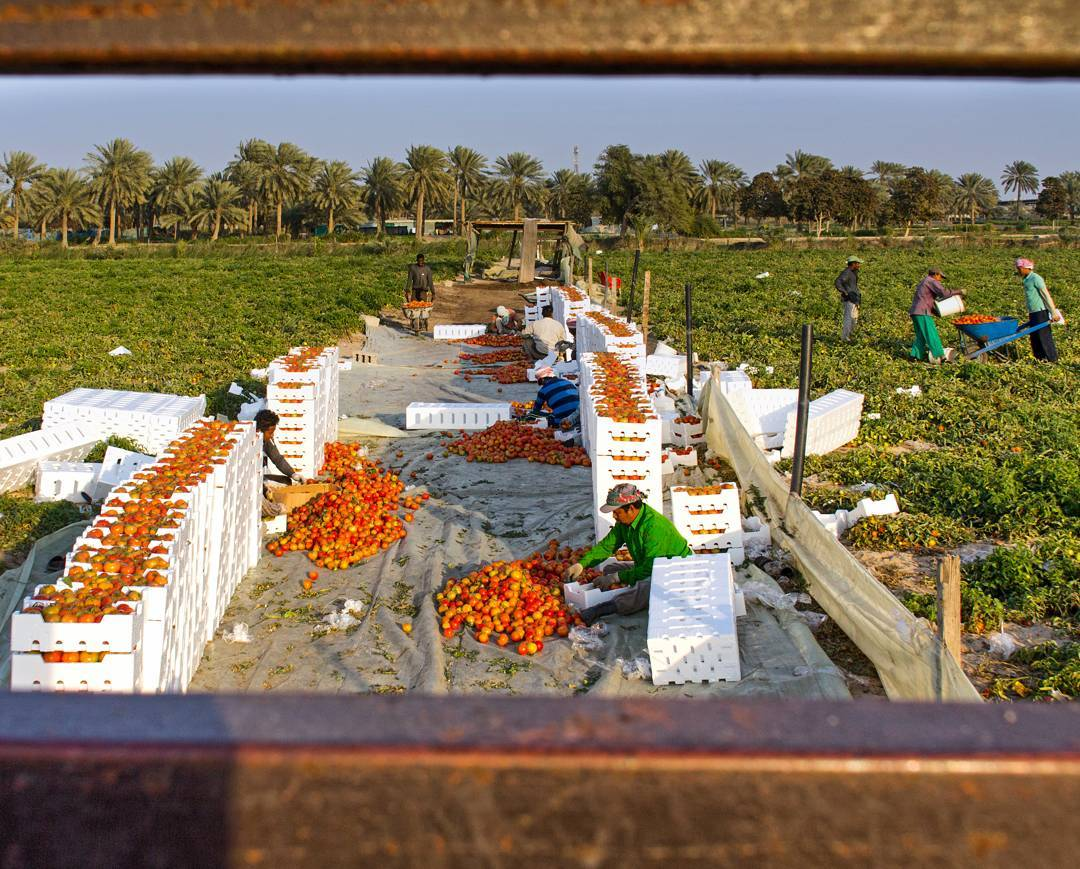
A tomato farm in Qatif

Fishing, however, was an underdeveloped aspect of the Saudi economy despite the abundance of fish and shellfish in coastal waters. The major reasons for the small size of this sector were the limited demand for fish and the comparative lack of fish marketing and processing facilities. Iraqi actions in releasing crude oil into the Persian Gulf during the Gulf War caused appreciable damage to fish and wildlife in the gulf. Data concerning postwar catches were not available in late 1992, but in 1989 the Food and Agriculture Organization of the United Nations estimated Saudi Arabia's total catch at more than 53,000 tons.

Saudi Arabia is suffering from a major depletion of the water in its underground aquifers and a resultant break down and disintegration of its agriculture as a consequence. As a result of the catastrophe, Saudi Arabia has bought agricultural land in the United States, Argentina, Indonesia, Thailand, and Africa. Saudi Arabia is ranked as a major buyer of agricultural land in foreign countries.
