= List of volcanoes in Saudi Arabia =

== List of volcanoes ==
This is a partial list of active and extinct volcanoes in Saudi Arabia.

Name	Elevation		Location	Last eruption
Name	meters	feet	Coordinates	Last eruption
Al Harrah	1100	3609	31.08°N 38.42°E	-
Harrat al Birk	381	1250	18.37°N 41.63°E	-
Harrat ar Rahah	1660	6398	27.80°N 36.17°E	-
Harrat Ithnayn	1625	5331	26.58°N 40.20°E	Holocene
Harrat Khaybar	2093	6867	25.00°N 39.92°E	650 ± 50
Harrat Kishb	1475	4839	22.80°N 41.38°E	Holocene
Harrat Lunayyir	1370	4495	25.17°N 37.75°E	1000
Harrat Rahat	1,744	5722	23.5°N 39.47°E	June to July 1256
Harrat 'Uwayrid	1900	6299	27.08°N 37.25°E	640
Jabal Yar	305	1001	17.05°N 42.83°E	1810 ± 10
Harrat Hutaymah	-	-	-	-
Al Hutaymah	-	-	-	-
Harrat ad Dakhana	-	-	-	-
Harrat ad Dehama	-	-	-	-
Harrat al Didadib	-	-	-	-
Jabal al Misharikah	-	-	-	-
Jabal Awared	-	-	-	-
Jabal Dilham	-	-	-	-
Jabal Duwayrah	-	-	-	-
Jabal Halat Utaynah	-	-	-	-
Jabal Salma	-	-	-	-
Samra as Safra	-	-	-	-
Shurmah cone	-	-	-	-
Tabah	-	-	-	-
Salma caldera	-	-	-	-
