= Salma caldera =

Late Proterozoic caldera complex in Saudi Arabia

The Salma caldera is a late Proterozoic caldera complex in the northeastern Arabian Shield of Saudi Arabia. It encompasses rhyolitic volcanic rocks, a peralkaline ring intrusion that rose along a fracture formed during caldera collapse, and a younger resurgent metaluminous and peraluminous granite core.
