= Harrat al Birk =

Lava field in Saudi Arabia

Coordinates: 18.37°N 41.63°E

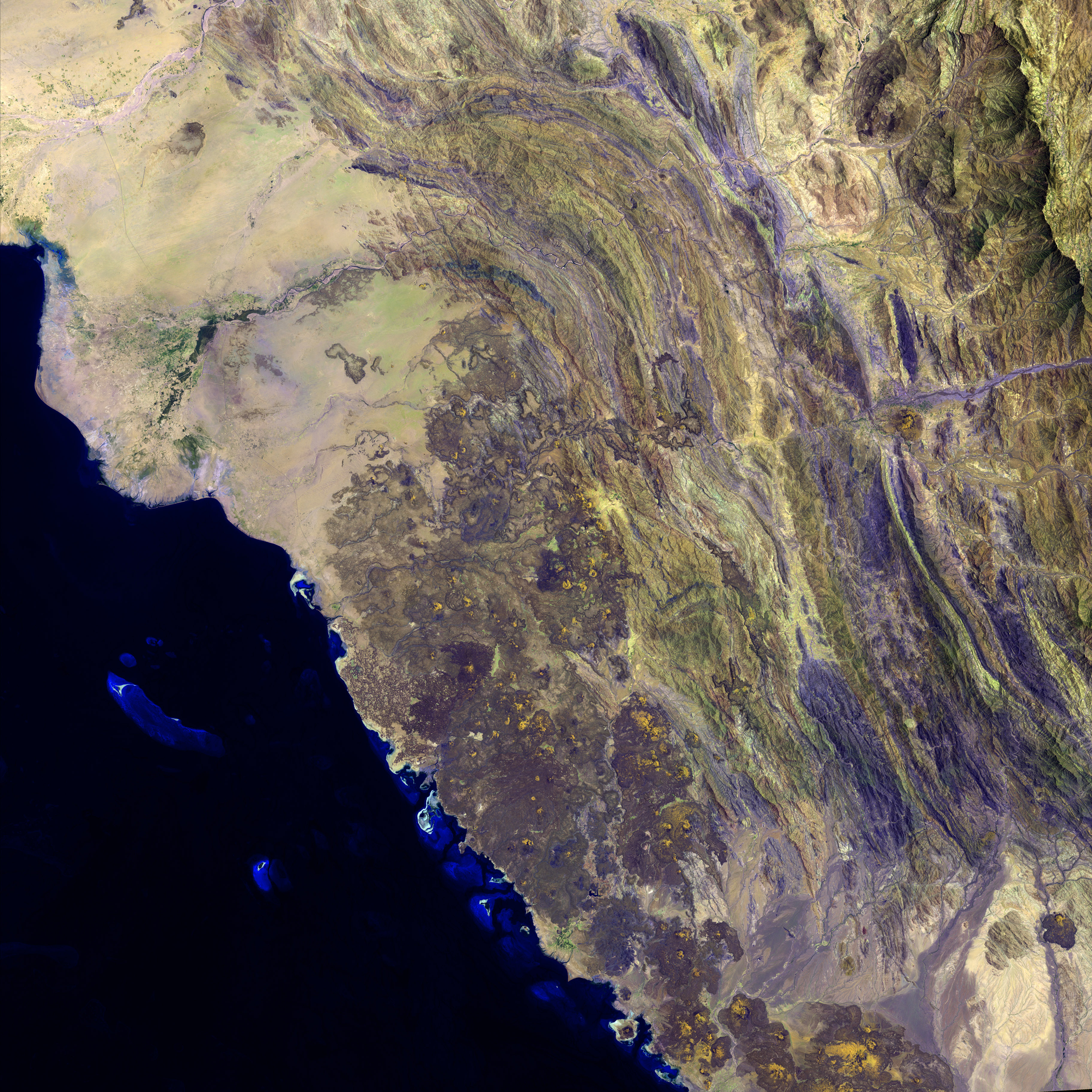
Harrat Al Birk along Saudi Arabia's Red Sea coastline

Ḥarrat al-Birk (Arabic: حَرَّة ٱلْبِرْك) is an ancient lava field located along Saudi Arabia's Red Sea coastline.

== See also ==
- 'Asir Region
- List of volcanoes in Saudi Arabia
- Sarat Mountains
  - 'Asir Mountains
- Tihamah
