= Harrat Kishb =

Coordinates: 22.8°N 41.38°E

Ḥarrat Kishb (Arabic: حَرَّة كِشْب) is a lava field 5,892 km^{2} in area, located in western Saudi Arabia. It is near the Al Wahbah Crater.

== See also ==
- List of volcanoes in Saudi Arabia
- Sarat Mountains
  - Hijaz Mountains
