= Harrat Rahat =

Volcanic lava field in Saudi Arabia

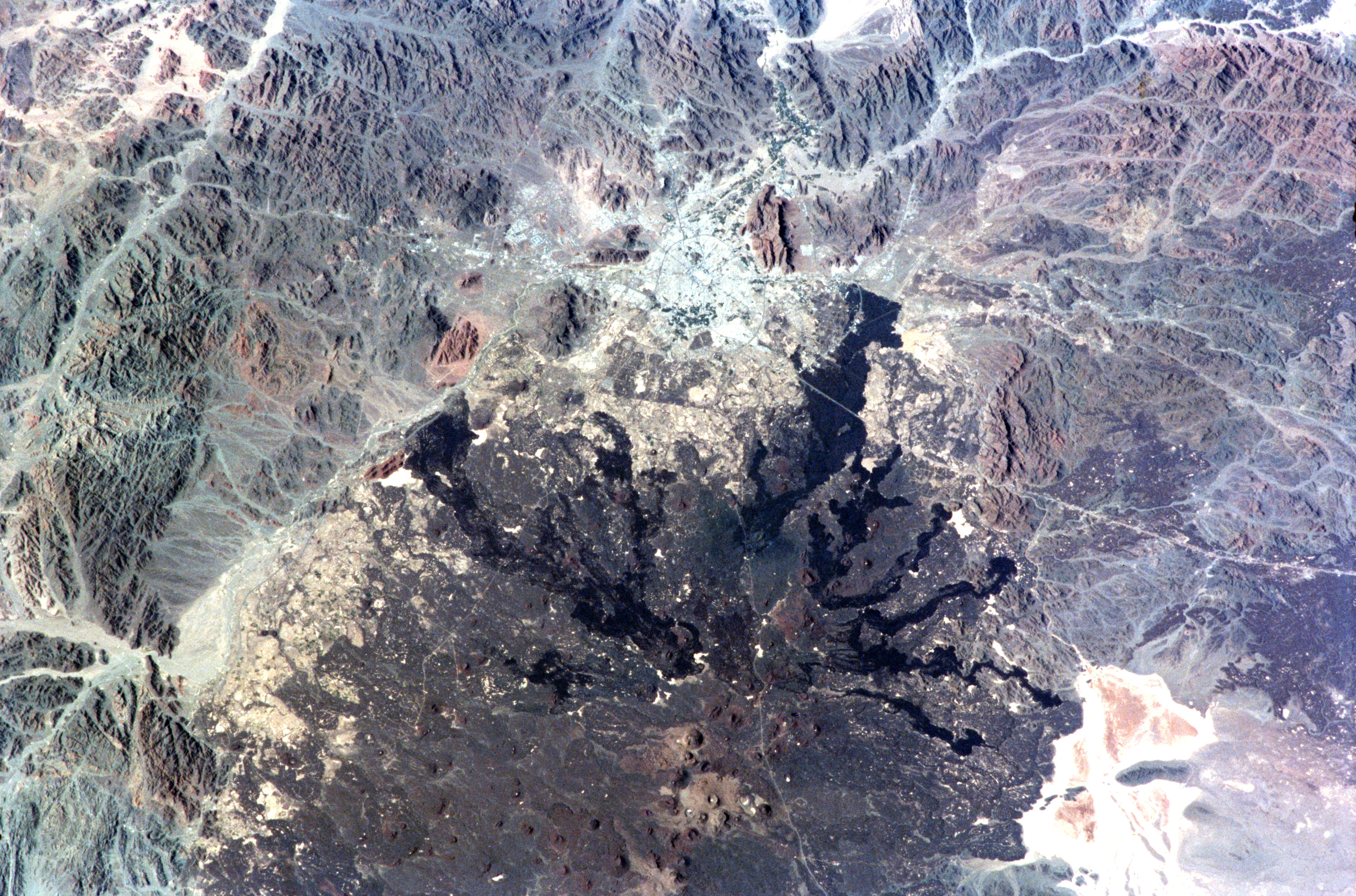
- Satellite picture of the northern part of the lava field

Highest point
- Elevation: 1,744 m (5,722 ft)
- Coordinates: 23°5′0″N 39°47′0″E

Naming
- Native name: حَرَّة رَهَاط (Arabic)

Geography
- Location: Hejaz, Saudi Arabia

Geology
- Mountain type: Volcanic field
- Last eruption: June to July 1256

Ḥarrat Rahāṭ (Arabic: حَرَّة رَهَاط) is a volcanic lava field in the Hejazi region of Saudi Arabia. In 1256 CE, a 0.5 km^{3} (0.12 cu mi) lava flow erupted from six aligned scoria cones, and traveled 23 km (14 miles) to within 4 km (2.5 miles) of the Islamic holy city of Medina; this was its last eruption. There were earlier eruptions, such as in 641 CE, which made finger-like flows to the east of the 1256 CE flow. It is the biggest lava field in Saudi Arabia..

There has been recent increase in seismic activity since 2009.

== See also ==
- List of volcanoes in Saudi Arabia
- Sarat Mountains
  - Hijaz Mountains
