= Harrat Lunayyir =

Lava field in Saudi Arabia

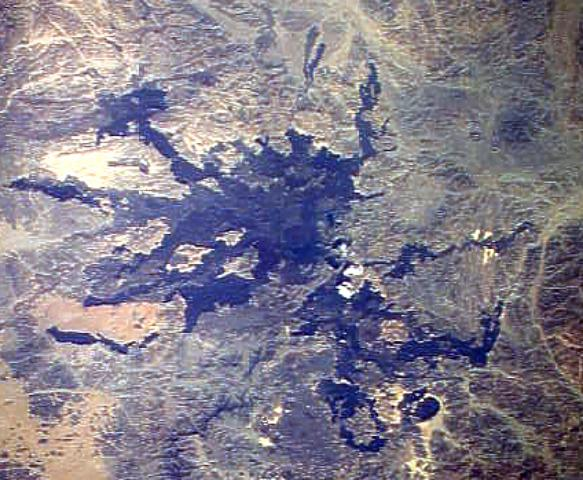
View of Harrat Lunayyir from the Space Shuttle

Ḥarrat Lunayyir (Arabic: حَرَّة لُنَيِّر) is a lava field in northwestern Saudi Arabia. In 2009 there were swarms of small earthquakes in the area; 2289 people were evacuated from the area. Fissures opened on the surface, and the area might now be considered volcanically active.
