= Barqat =

Barqat برقت Baraqt
- Hamlet
- Location in Oman
- Coordinates: 18°13′51″N 56°33′08″E
- Country: Oman
- Governorate: Al Wusta Governorate
- Wilayat (province): Al Jazer

Area
  - Total: 0.93 km^{2} (0.36 sq mi)

Population (2020)
  - Total: 62
- Time zone: UTC+4 (Oman Standard Time)

Barqat, or Baraqt (Arabic: برقت, romanized: Barakat) is a hamlet off of Al Lakbi in Al Jazer, Al Wusta Governorate, in southern Oman. As of the 2020 Omani census, it had a population of 62. The population of Barqat has gone down by 19 since the census in 2003.

== See also ==
Al Lakbi
Al Wusta Governorate
