= Dharbut =

Dharbut ذربوت
- Hamlet
- Location in Oman
- Coordinates: 18°53′40″N 57°02′01″E
- Country: Oman
- Governorate: Al Wusta Governorate
- Wilayat (province): Ad-Duqm

Population (2020)
  - Total: 32
- Time zone: UTC+4 (Oman Standard Time)

Dharbut (Arabic: ذربوت, romanized: Dharbūt) is a hamlet in Duqm, Al Wusta Governorate, in southern Oman. As of the 2020 Omani census, it had a population of 32.

== See also ==
Al Lakbi
Al Wusta Governorate
