= Dithab =

Dithab ديثاب Dīthāb
- Village
- Location in Oman
- Coordinates: 18°55′15″N 57°06′31″E
- Country: Oman
- Governorate: Al Wusta Governorate
- Province: Ad Duqm

Population (1-1-2024)
  - Total: 475
- Time zone: UTC+4 (Oman Standard Time)

Dithab (Arabic: ديثاب, romanized: Dīthāb) is a village in Ad Duqm in the Al Wusta Governorate of Oman, near the coast of the Arabian Sea. In 2024, it had a population of 475.
