= Petroleum industry in Kuwait =

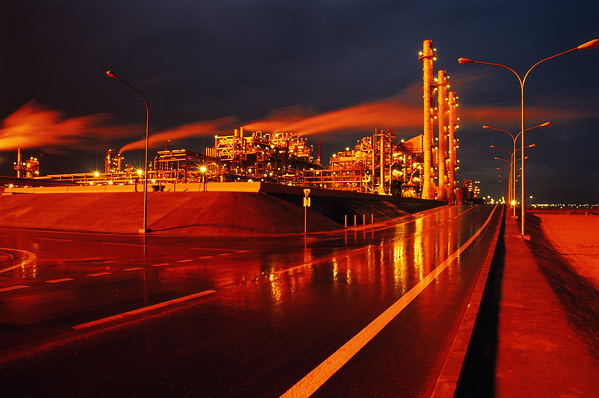
An oil refinery in Mina-Al-Ahmadi, Kuwait

The petroleum industry in Kuwait is the largest industry in the country, accounting nearly half of the country's GDP. Kuwait has proven crude oil reserves of 104 billion barrels (15 km^{3}), estimated to be 9% of the world's reserves. Kuwait's oil reserves are the sixth largest in the world and the Burgan Field is the second largest oil field. Kuwait is the world's eleventh largest oil producer and seventh largest exporter. Kuwait's oil production accounts for 7% of world-wide oil production.

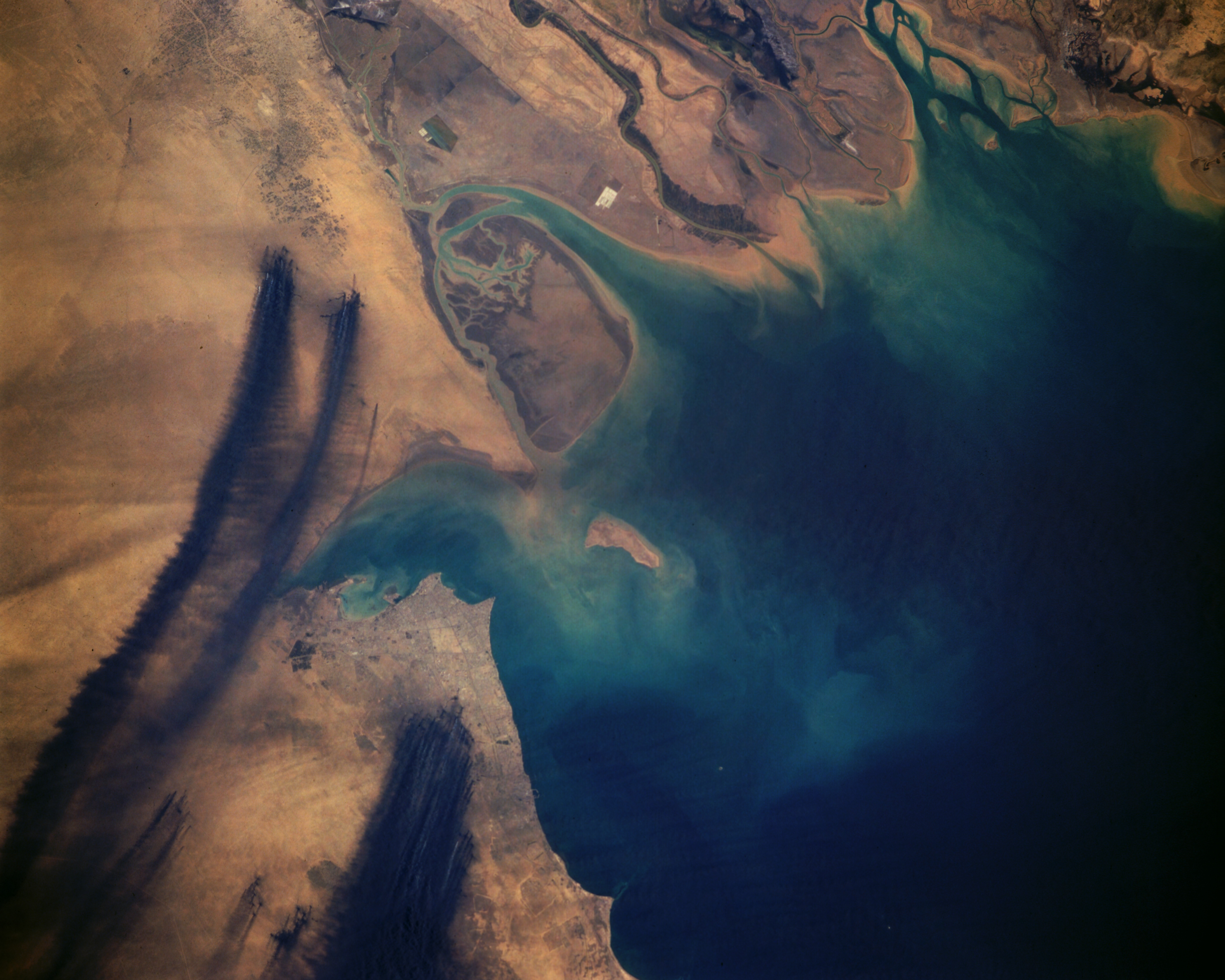
Smoke from burning Kuwait oil fields set on fire by retreating Iraq forces during the Gulf War

Since the government of Kuwait owns the petroleum industry, it controls a lot of the country's economy; in all, about 43 percent of the GDP. Kuwait’s oil exports vary depending on internal needs – almost all of Kuwait’s energy is derived from oil – and on international demand and prices and production quotas fixed by the OPEC, of which Kuwait is a member. OPEC’s quotas, however, are difficult to enforce, and Kuwait and other countries have been accused of violating them. In 2005, oil production was an estimated 2.418 million bbl/day.

Kuwait's chief oil companies are:

- Kuwait Petroleum Corporation (KPC) : Holding group responsible for international marketing.
- Kuwait Oil Company (KOC) : Crude oil exploration and development company.
- Kuwait National Petroleum Company (KNPC) : Runs oil refineries across Kuwait.
- Petrochemicals Industries Company (PIC) : Petrochemical and fertilizer manufacturer.
- Kuwait Petroleum International (KPI, also known as "Q8") : Runs refining and marketing business overseas.
- Kuwait Foreign Petroleum Exploration Company (KUFPEC) : International oil exploration company.
- Equate petrochemical company (EQUATE) : A petrochemical company formed by PIC and Dow Chemical.
- Petroleum Training Centre (PTC) : Responsible for all training and career development within the KPC companies.
- Kuwait Oil Tanker Company (KOTC) : Crude oil shipping
- Kuwait Aviation Fueling Company (KAFCO) : Aircraft fuel
- Kuwait Gulf Oil Company (KGOC) : Oil and gas exploration and production in the Saudi-Kuwaiti neutral zone; joint venture with Saudi Arabia.
- Oil Sector Services Company (OSSC) : Handles all construction projects, maintenance, security, fire-fighting, and medical services to all oil sector employees and their families.
- Oil Development Company (ODC)

== Recent exploration ==
On 26 May 2025 Saudi Arabia and Kuwait have announced a major oil discovery in the Partitioned Zone, near the North Wafra Wara-Burgan field, about five kilometers from the Wafra field. The well produced over 500 barrels per day of crude with an API gravity of 26–27 degrees. It’s the first find since joint operations resumed in 2020, highlighting the countries' continued energy cooperation and commitment to global supply security.

== See also ==
- List of oil fields
