= Haytam =

Haytam هيتام Haitam, Hitam, Haytām
- Village
- Location in Oman
- Coordinates: 18°50′47″N 56°55′22″E
- Country: Oman
- Governorate: Al Wusta Governorate
- Wilayat: Ad Duqm

Population (2020-12-12)
  - Total: 1,238
- Time zone: UTC+4 (GST)

Haytam (Arabic: هيتام, romanized: Haytām) is a coastal village in the wilayat of Duqm in the Al Wusta Governorate of Oman. In 2020, it had a population of 1,238.
