= Nafun =

Nafun نفون Nafūn, Nafoon
- Village
- Location in Oman
- Coordinates: 19°48′52″N 57°43′14″E
- Country: Oman
- Governorate: Al Wusta Governorate
- Province: Ad Duqm

Population (1-1-2024)
  - Total: 172
- Time zone: UTC+4 (Oman Standard Time)

Nafun (Arabic: نفون, romanized: Nafūn) is a village just north of Duqm and located in the Duqm wilayat, in the Al Wusta Governorate of Oman, bordering the coast of the Arabian Sea. In 2024, it had a population of 172. While working in an archaeological site in Nafun, the Ministry of Heritage and Tourism, in cooperation with the Institute of Archaeology of the Czech Academy of Sciences dug up a Neolithic era mass grave, which led to many more discoveries in the area.
