= Thalin, Oman =

Thalin ثلين Thalīn
- Village
- Location in Oman
- Coordinates: 18°55′31″N 57°10′43″E
- Country: Oman
- Governorate: Al Wusta Governorate
- Wilayat: Ad Duqm

Population (2020-12-12)
  - Total: 271
- Time zone: UTC+4 (GST)

Thalin (Arabic: ثلين, romanized: Thalīn) is a coastal village in the wilayat of Duqm in the Al Wusta Governorate of Oman. In 2020, it had a population of 271.
