= Sawqrah =

Sawqrah صوقرة Sawqirah, Şawqirah, Şawqarah
- Village
- Location in Oman
- Coordinates: 18°09′28″N 56°32′19″E
- Country: Oman
- Governorate: Al Wusta Governorate
- Province: Al Jazer

Population (2020-12-12)
  - Total: 744
- Time zone: UTC+4 (GST)

Sawqrah (Arabic: صوقرة) is a coastal village in Al Jazer in the Al Wusta Governorate of Oman. In 2020, it had a population of 744.
