= Madir =

Madir مادر Mādir, Mādar
- Village
- Location in Oman
- Coordinates: 18°16′44″N 56°34′35″E
- Country: Oman
- Governorate: Al Wusta Governorate
- Province: Al Jazer

Population (2020-12-12)
  - Total: 453
- Time zone: UTC+4 (GST)

Madir (Arabic: مادر, romanized: Mādir) is a coastal village in Al Jazer in the Al Wusta Governorate of Oman. In 2020, it had a population of 453.
