= KOTC =

KOTC may refer to:

- King of the Cage
- Kuwait Oil Tanker Company S.A.K, a subsidiary of Kuwait Petroleum Corporation
- KOTC-LP, a low-power radio station (98.7 FM) licensed to serve Jefferson City, Missouri, United States
- WUMY (AM), a radio station (830 AM) licensed to serve Memphis, Tennessee, United States, which held the call sign KOTC from 1995 to 2013
