= Al Jashrib =

Al Jashrib الجشريب Al-Jashrīb
- Village
- Location in Oman
- Coordinates: 18°33′35″N 56°35′17″E
- Country: Oman
- Governorate: Al Wusta Governorate
- Province: Al Jazer

Population (2020-12-12)
  - Total: 291
- Time zone: UTC+4 (GST)

Al Jashrib (Arabic: الجشريب, romanized: Al Jashrīb) is a village near the coast in Al Jazer in the Al Wusta Governorate of Oman. In 2020, it had a population of 291.
