= Kuwait Petroleum International =

Kuwaiti petroleum refining and marketing company

Kuwait Petroleum International Limited

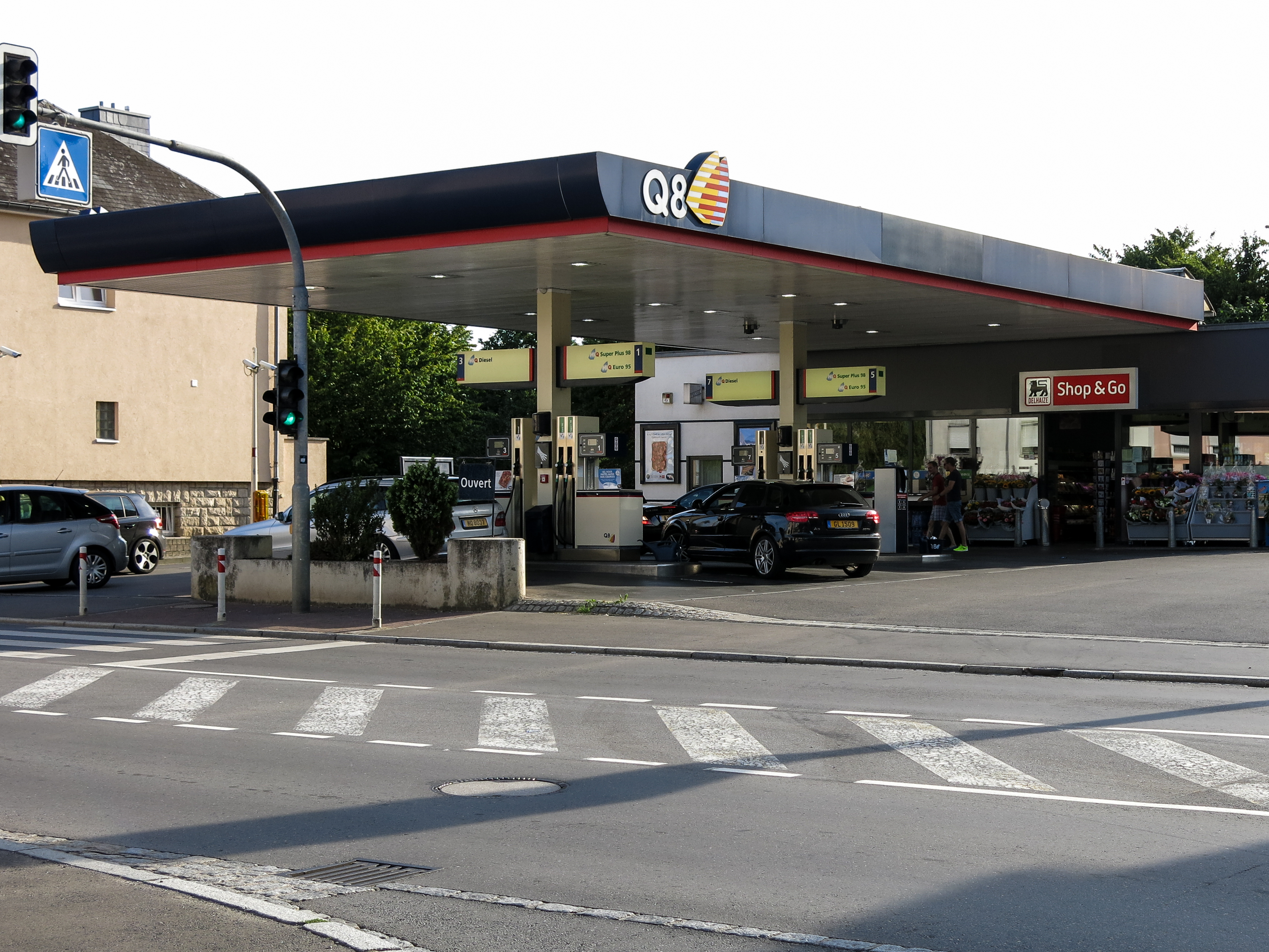
- A Q8 filling station in Luxembourg
- Trade name: Q8
- Type: Subsidiary
- Industry: Petroleum industry
- Founded: February 3, 1983; 43 years ago
- Founder: Kuwait Petroleum Corporation
- Headquarters: Kuwait City, Kuwait
- Area served: Europe, Middle East and Asia-Pacific
- Products: Gasoline; Diesel fuel; Jet fuel; Lubricants; Heating oil; Other petroleum products
- Services: Petroleum refining; Fuel retailing; Aviation fuel supply
- Parent: Kuwait Petroleum Corporation
- Website: www.q8.com

Kuwait Petroleum International (KPI), trading under the brand name Q8, is a Kuwaiti petroleum refining and marketing company and a wholly owned subsidiary of the state-owned Kuwait Petroleum Corporation (KPC). Headquartered in Kuwait City, the company operates internationally, primarily in Europe, with additional interests in Asia and the Middle East.

Founded in 1983, KPI specialises in the refining, distribution and marketing of petroleum products, including motor fuels, aviation fuel, lubricants and heating oil. Its activities encompass retail filling stations, direct fuel sales, commercial transport services and investments in international oil refineries.

The company's principal brand, Q8, was introduced in 1986. The name is pronounced "cue-eight", a phonetic play on the English pronunciation of "Kuwait".

== History ==
Kuwait Petroleum International (KPI) was established on 3 February 1983 as a subsidiary of Kuwait Petroleum Corporation (KPC). Its formation followed KPC's acquisition of Gulf Oil's refining and marketing operations in the Benelux countries in February 1983, followed by those in Sweden and Denmark in March. The company expanded into Italy in 1984 through the acquisition of Gulf Oil's Italian retail network.

In 1986, KPI introduced the Q8 brand and established its headquarters in London. During the same period, the company entered the British retail fuel market through the acquisition of Hays Petroleum Services, followed by the Ultramar and Nafta networks. In 1987, KPI expanded its Danish operations by acquiring the retail marketing assets of BP.

In 1990, KPI acquired the refining and fuel distribution operations of Mobil Oil Italiana from Mobil, expanding its presence in the Italian market. In 1996, Kuwait Petroleum Italia acquired a 50% stake in the Milazzo refinery in Sicily, establishing a refining joint venture with Agip, which was subsequently incorporated into Eni.

KPI continued its European expansion in the late 1990s. In 1998, it reached an agreement to establish a joint venture in Sweden with the OK cooperative, which began operations under the OKQ8 brand on 1 January 1999. In Belgium, KPI acquired 157 BP service stations in October 1998, followed by the acquisition of Aral's Belgian operations, comprising approximately 200 service stations, in July 1999.

In March 2004, KPI acquired the Tango network of automated filling stations from the Dutch company Petroplus. At the time of the acquisition, the network comprised 62 operating stations in the Netherlands and four in Belgium, with an additional site under development in Spain. Later that year, KPI sold its British retail and fuel distribution operations to Refined Holdings, a consortium including Malthurst. The acquired business subsequently operated under the Pace Petroleum name, while KPI retained other activities in the United Kingdom.

In 2005, KPI sold its retail network of 117 filling stations and its lubricants business in Thailand to the Malaysian state-owned petroleum company Petronas. The following year, KPI sold its German retail subsidiary, Kuwait Petroleum Deutschland, which operated 37 service stations under the Markant brand, to Westfalen AG.

In April 2017, KPI entered into a partnership with Oman Oil Company, subsequently renamed OQ, to jointly develop the Duqm Refinery and Petrochemical Complex in Duqm, Oman. The agreement established KPI as an equal partner in the refinery project.

== Branding ==
The Q8 brand and logo were introduced in 1986. Designed by Wolff Olins, the logo features two stylised sails inspired by the dhow, a traditional Arabian sailing vessel. Its yellow, red and blue colours symbolise the desert, sun and sea, respectively.

== Operations ==
=== Retail fuel distribution ===
KPI operates a network of more than 3,500 branded filling stations across Europe. It operates under the Q8 and Q8 easy brands in Italy, Belgium, Luxembourg, Spain and Portugal, Tango in the Netherlands, and Q8 and F24 in Denmark. In Sweden, it operates under the OKQ8 brand through a joint venture with OK Economic Association.

A Tango petrol station in Veendam, Netherlands

An OKQ8 petrol station in Brösarp, Sweden

In Vietnam, KPI operates five filling stations under the Idemitsu Q8 brand through a joint venture with Japan's Idemitsu Kosan.

=== Commercial transport services ===
KPI provides fuel card and refuelling services to international road transport companies through Q8Truck, formerly known as International Diesel Service (IDS).

In June 2025, IDS was rebranded as Q8Truck, reflecting an expansion of its services beyond conventional diesel refuelling to include additional transport and mobility solutions.

The Q8Truck network provides access to more than 1,200 refuelling locations across 27 European countries. Its services include automated filling stations, secure fuel cards and fleet management tools.

=== Aviation fuel ===
KPI operates an aviation fuel business through Q8Aviation, which supplies jet fuel to commercial airlines and other aviation customers. The business supplies aviation fuel at more than 75 international and regional airports, with operations concentrated in Europe and other international aviation markets.

=== Lubricants ===
KPI markets automotive and industrial lubricants under the Q8Oils brand. Its lubricants operations include product development, manufacturing, distribution and international sales. Q8Oils operates lubricant blending facilities in Belgium and Italy, serving automotive and industrial customers.

=== Refining and joint ventures ===
KPI has investments in petroleum refining facilities in Europe, Southeast Asia and the Middle East. Its principal refining joint ventures include:

- Milazzo refinery – Located in Milazzo, Sicily, Italy, and operated as a joint venture with Eni.
- Nghi Son Refinery – Located in Thanh Hóa province, Vietnam, and developed in partnership with PetroVietnam, Idemitsu Kosan and Mitsui Chemicals. KPI held a 35.1% interest in the project as reported in December 2023.
- Duqm Refinery (OQ8) – Located in Duqm, Oman, and jointly owned by KPI and the Omani energy company OQ, each holding a 50% interest.

=== Biofuels ===
In June 2024, KPI completed the acquisition of a 50% stake in the Italian biofuel producer Eco Fox SRL, a company previously wholly owned by Fox Petroli. The investment marked an expansion of KPI's activities into biofuel production.

== See also ==
- Kuwait Petroleum Corporation
- Petroleum industry in Kuwait
