= Nizar Al-Adsani =

Kuwaiti entrepreneur

- Born: Nizar Mohammed Al-Adsani
- Education: South Dakota State University
- Occupations: Former deputy chair and ceo, kuwait petroleum corporation

Nizar Mohammed Al-Adsani is a Kuwaiti businessman and former deputy-chairman and chief executive officer (CEO) of Kuwait Petroleum Corporation.

== Education ==
Al-Adsani has a bachelor's degree in mechanical engineering from South Dakota State University.

== Career ==
Al-Adsani started his career at Kuwait Oil Company (KOC) in 1984. Beginning as a mechanical engineer, he held various positions, rising to superintendent, engineering projects in 1993, head of operational planning in 1997 and general superintendent, project management in 1999. At Kuwait Petroleum Company (KPC) he became manager of planning & investment coordination upstream, switching companies and positions in 1999 and staying until 2004. In 2004 he then was named executive director for business administration at Al-Khafji Joint Operations (KJO) and became a member of the joint operating committee. He was later promoted to deputy managing director at the Kuwait Gulf Oil Company in November 2007 and became a Kuwait Foreign Petroleum Exploration Company's board member in the same year. He was also appointed deputy managing director for Al-Khafji Joint Operations and became a member of the joint executive committee (JEC). Two years later, in October 2009, Al-Adsani was appointed chairman of the Joint Operating Committee at KJO. He held the position until 2011. In 2011 he became a board member of the Kuwait Gulf Operation Committee (KGOC) and from 2011 to 2013 he served as chairman and managing director of Kuwait Foreign Petroleum Exploration Company (KUFPEC).

Al-Adsani was the deputy chairman and chief executive officer of Kuwait Petroleum Corporation (KPC) from May 2013 to December 2018.

Al-Adsani comments on the developments within KPC and energy sector related developments. He speaks at conferences.
