= Fadi, Oman =

Fadi فاضي Fāḑī
- Village
- Location in Oman
- Coordinates: 18°14′52″N 56°33′44″E
- Country: Oman
- Governorate: Al Wusta Governorate
- Province: Al Jazer

Population (2020-12-12)
  - Total: 136
- Time zone: UTC+4 (GST)

Fadi (Arabic: فاضي, romanized: Fāḑī) is a coastal village in Al Jazer in the Al Wusta Governorate of Oman. In 2020, it had a population of 136.
