= Al Khaluf =

Al Khaluf الخلوف Al-Khalūf, Al Khaloof, Khalouf, Khaloof
- Village
- Location in Oman
- Coordinates: 20°28′13″N 58°03′45″E
- Country: Oman
- Governorate: Al Wusta Governorate
- Wilayat (province): Mahout

Area
  - Total: 10.5 km^{2} (4.1 sq mi)

Population (2020)
  - Total: 1,021
  - Density: 97.15/km^{2} (251.6/sq mi)
- Time zone: UTC+4 (Oman Standard Time)

Al Khaluf (Arabic: الخلوف, romanized: Al-Khalūf) is a fishing village in Mahout, Al Wusta Governorate, in east-central Oman. As of the 2020 Omani census, it had a population of 1,021. The population of Al Khaluf has seen an average annual growth rate of 3.2% since the census in 2010.
