= Al Kahil =

Al Kahil الكحل
- Village
- Location in Oman
- Coordinates: 18°34′55″N 56°35′48″E
- Country: Oman
- Governorate: Al Wusta Governorate
- Wilayat: Al Jazer

Population (2020)
  - Total: 1,547
- Time zone: UTC+4 (Oman Standard Time)

Al Kahil (Arabic: الكحل) is a village in Al Jazer, Al Wusta Governorate, in southern Oman. In 2020, it had a population of 1,547.
