= Wadi Ghayl =

Wadi Ghayl وادي غيل Wādī Ghayl
- Village
- Location in Oman
- Coordinates: 18°23′37″N 56°34′02″E
- Country: Oman
- Governorate: Al Wusta Governorate
- Province: Al Jazer

Population (1-1-2024)
  - Total: 165
- Time zone: UTC+4 (Oman Standard Time)

Wadi Ghayl (Arabic: وادي غيل, romanized: Wādī Ghayl) is a village in Al Jazer in the Al Wusta Governorate of Oman, around 3 kilometers from the sea. In 2024, it had a population of 165.
