= Qayşad =

Qayşad قيصد Qaysad
- Hamlet
- Location in Oman
- Coordinates: 18°17′07″N 56°34′39″E
- Country: Oman
- Governorate: Al Wusta Governorate
- Wilayat: Al Jazer

Population (2020)
  - Total: 37
- Time zone: UTC+4 (Oman Standard Time)

Qayşad (Arabic: قيصد) is a hamlet in Al Jazer, Al Wusta Governorate, in southern Oman. In 2020, it had a population of 37.
