= Al Hawiyah, Oman =

Al Hawiyah الحوية Al-Ḩawīyah
- Village
- Location in Oman
- Coordinates: 19°35′09″N 57°38′44″E
- Country: Oman
- Governorate: Al Wusta Governorate
- Wilayat (province): Ad-Duqm

Area
  - Total: 0.93 km^{2} (0.36 sq mi)

Population (2020)
  - Total: 773
  - Density: 23.1/km^{2} (60/sq mi)
- Time zone: UTC+4 (Oman Standard Time)

Al Hawiyah, or Al-Hawiyah (Arabic: , romanized: Al-Ḩawīyah) is a village off of Duqm in the Duqm Wilayat, Al Wusta Governorate, in Oman. As of the 2020 Omani census, it had a population of 773.
