= Hijj =

Hijj حج
- Town
- Location in Oman
- Coordinates: 20°45′52″N 58°17′34″E
- Country: Oman
- Governorate: Al Wusta Governorate
- Wilayats (province): Mahout

Population (2020-12-12)
  - Total: 7,366
- Time zone: UTC+4 (Oman Standard Time)

Hijj (Arabic: حج) is the center town of Mahout, Al Wusta Governorate, in east-central Oman. As of the 2020 Omani census, it had a population of 7,366.
