= Al Jubah =

Al Jubah الجوبة Al-Jūbah, Al Joba, Al Jobah, Al-Jobah, Al-Juba
- Village
- Location in Oman
- Coordinates: 20°54′07″N 58°14′40″E
- Country: Oman
- Governorate: Al Wusta Governorate
- Wilayat (province): Mahout

Population (2020)
  - Total: 2,115
- Time zone: UTC+4 (Oman Standard Time)

Al Jubah, or Al-Jubah (Arabic: الجوبة, romanized: Al-Jūbah) is a village in Mahout, Al Wusta Governorate, in east-central Oman. As of the 2020 Omani census, it had a population of 2,115. Before 2011, it was part of the Ash Sharqiyah Region of Oman.
