= Nafta =

NAFTA is an acronym for the North American Free Trade Agreement.

Nafta or NAFTA may also refer to:

- National Amalgamated Furnishing Trades Association, or NAFTA, a British trade union
- New Zealand Australia Free Trade Agreement, or NAFTA, a 1965 trade agreement
- Nafta (oil company), a Soviet Union oil company operating abroad
- NK Nafta 1903, current Slovenian association football team
- NK Nafta Lendava, defunct Slovenian association football team

== See also ==
- Naphtha, various liquid hydrocarbon intermediates produced from fossil fuel
- Nefta, Tunisia
