= Duqm Refinery =

Oil refinery in Oman

Coordinates: 19°43′50″N 57°39′20″E

Duqm Refinery مصفاة الدقم
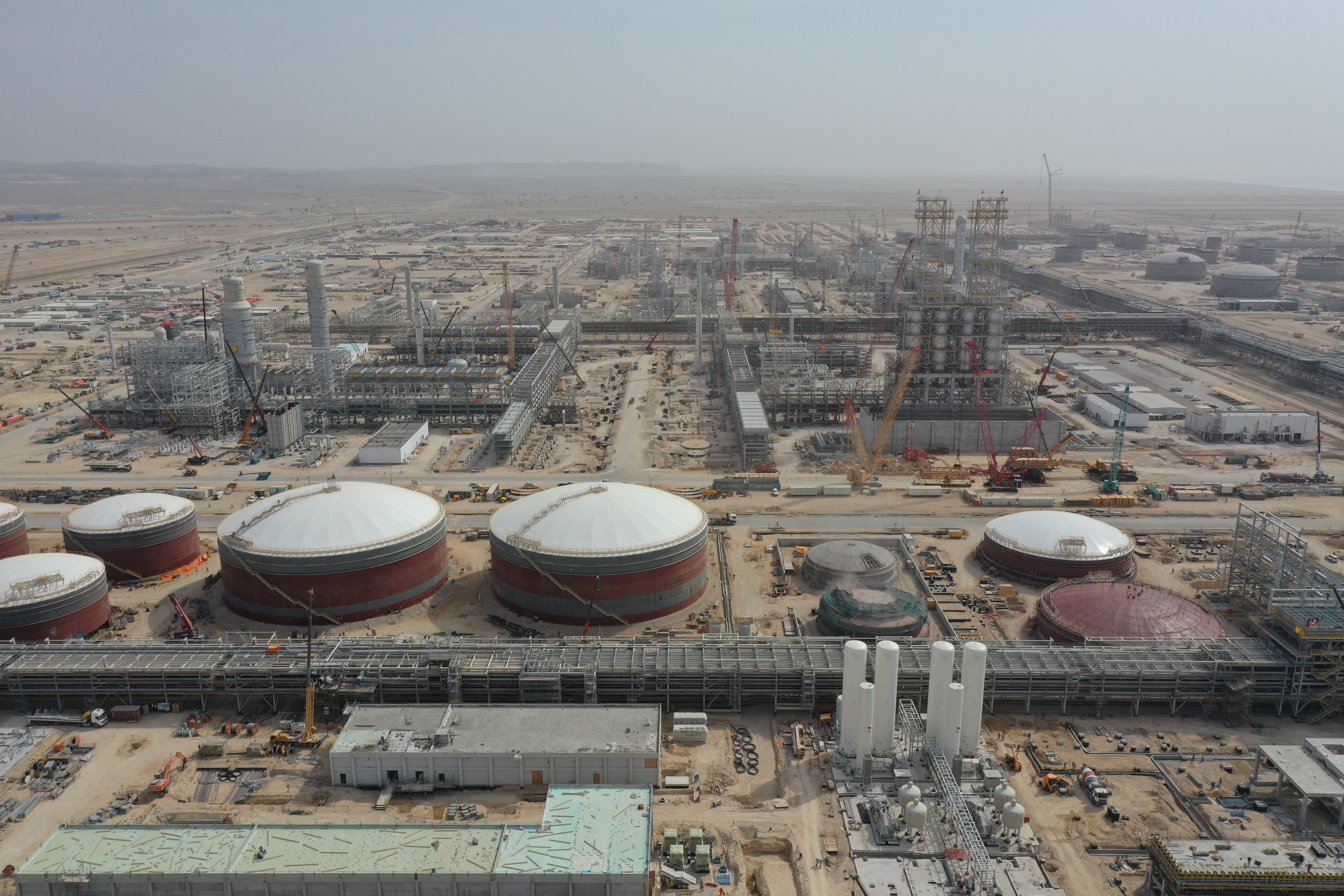
- The refinery seen from above
- Interactive map of Duqm Refinery مصفاة الدقم
- Location: Duqm, Oman

Refinery details
- Operator: OQ8
- Owners: OQ, Kuwait Petroleum International
- Capacity: 230,000 barrels per day (37,000 m^{3}/d)

Duqm Refinery is an oil refinery at the port town of Duqm in central-eastern Oman, and is expected to have a capacity of 230,000 barrels per day. It is owned and operated by OQ8, a joint venture between OQ, a subsidiary of the Government of Oman, and Kuwait Petroleum International, a subsidiary of Kuwait Petroleum Corporation.

In September 2023, Duqm Refinery completed its start-up processes, and planned to begin commercial operations by the end of the year.

The refinery planned to add another 5% to 10% of output in 2024, and possibly increase its naphtha production.
