= Duqm Rock Garden =

The Rock Garden in Duqm is a geological site in the Sultanate of Oman. The Garden is part of the Special Economic Zone at Duqm.

Visitors can register online, although this is not mandatory, as admittance is not paid.

== Location ==
The Rock Garden is located in Duqm of Al Wusta Governorate in the Sultanate of Oman. It is located about 550 km from Muscat. The Rock Garden is located inside the Economic Zone at Duqm.

== Facilities ==
There is no information point at this attraction, nor other tourist services, however there are plans to add these in the future. The Ministry of Tourism in the Sultanate of Oman has fenced the garden to prevent any damage to it.
