= Mahout (Oman) =

Mahout محوت Maḩawt, Muḥūt
- Wilayat
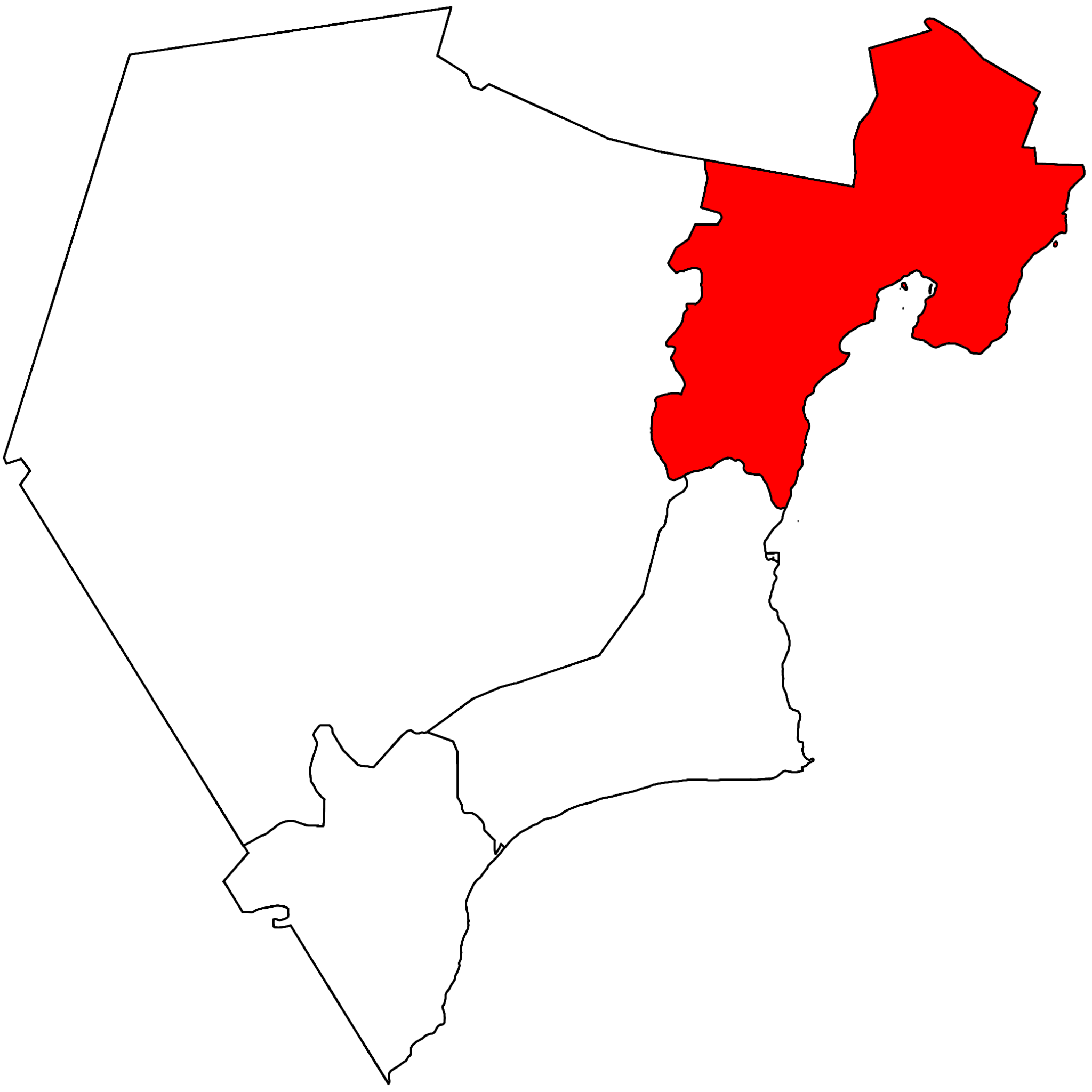
- The wilayat of Mahout in the Al Wusta Governorate shaded red

- Location within Oman
- Coordinates: 20°45′41″N 58°17′22″E
- Country: Oman
- Governorate: Al Wusta

Population (2020)
  - Total: 17,422
- Time zone: UTC+4 (Oman Standard Time)

Mahout (Arabic: محوت, romanized: Muḥūt) is a wilayat (province) in the Al Wusta Governorate, Oman. It is located in the northeastern part of the Governorate and is bordered to the east by the Arabian Sea and the Wetland Reserve, to the west by the Wilayat of Haima, to the south by the Wilayat of Duqm and to the north by the Wilayat of Adam in the Governorate of A'Dakhiliyah and the Niyabat of Sinaw in the Wilayat of Al Mudhaibi, the center of the Wilayat of Mahout is located in the village of Hijj. 32 villages make up the wilayat, including Hijj, Al Joba, Al Sail, Sirab, Al Najda, Al Khalouf, Mdaira, Sadaira, and others.

== Way of life ==
In the state, there are two modes of life: the traditional pattern followed by the majority of the Bedouin population, who own camels and cattle and migrate from one region to another, and their movement follows the availability of herbs where the rain falls, while the second pattern forms the concept of modern society, where some families live in villages and valleys in a stable manner throughout the year.

== Traditional crafts ==
The fabrics they create from "hair" by spinning, weaving, khurooj, and boiling are known as "al-'eina" and are used as "bedding" and house coverings.

== The islands ==
There are three islands in the wilayat, the most significant of which is Mahout, which is surrounded by mangrove trees on all sides. The island is well-known for the variety of fish and the large number of shrimp in its water. On Mahout Island, women and children gather various kinds of shells known as "Ja'afour," which are then cooked in water at a high temperature to remove the flesh before being dried and combined with rice for a delectable flavor. Followed by Al-Rak, which has a beautiful landscape, and Ebb, which is distinguished by the presence of numerous migratory birds and seabirds like seagulls and herons. The Wilayat of Mahut's beaches have several notable points, although Sweihel Kanasah, Ras Ruwais, Al Khilaf, Nabtoot, Ras Al Zakher, and Ras Khibbat Sarab are among the most important.

== Climate ==
Climate data for Mahout (Al Jubah) (1991–2020 normals, extremes 2005–2023)
Month	Jan	Feb	Mar	Apr	May	Jun	Jul	Aug	Sep	Oct	Nov	Dec	Year
Record high °C (°F)	34.0 (93.2)	37.6 (99.7)	42.8 (109.0)	44.2 (111.6)	50.7 (123.3)	51.6 (124.9)	49.9 (121.8)	44.2 (111.6)	43.6 (110.5)	42.0 (107.6)	38.8 (101.8)	35.5 (95.9)	51.6 (124.9)
Mean daily maximum °C (°F)	28.2 (82.8)	30.2 (86.4)	33.9 (93.0)	38.2 (100.8)	40.7 (105.3)	40.2 (104.4)	37.5 (99.5)	35.8 (96.4)	35.8 (96.4)	36.5 (97.7)	32.6 (90.7)	29.5 (85.1)	34.9 (94.9)
Daily mean °C (°F)	20.8 (69.4)	22.3 (72.1)	25.5 (77.9)	29.4 (84.9)	31.9 (89.4)	31.9 (89.4)	29.5 (85.1)	28.2 (82.8)	28.1 (82.6)	28.1 (82.6)	25.3 (77.5)	22.2 (72.0)	26.9 (80.5)
Mean daily minimum °C (°F)	13.8 (56.8)	14.7 (58.5)	18.5 (65.3)	22.2 (72.0)	25.3 (77.5)	26.6 (79.9)	24.7 (76.5)	24.0 (75.2)	23.1 (73.6)	21.4 (70.5)	18.8 (65.8)	15.4 (59.7)	20.7 (69.3)
Record low °C (°F)	6.2 (43.2)	6.8 (44.2)	10.6 (51.1)	16.8 (62.2)	20.5 (68.9)	21.3 (70.3)	23.8 (74.8)	22.1 (71.8)	19.4 (66.9)	15.8 (60.4)	13.5 (56.3)	8.4 (47.1)	6.2 (43.2)
Average precipitation mm (inches)	0.4 (0.02)	3.7 (0.15)	6.6 (0.26)	0.7 (0.03)	0.3 (0.01)	12.7 (0.50)	0.5 (0.02)	1.9 (0.07)	0.1 (0.00)	2.9 (0.11)	10.8 (0.43)	3.1 (0.12)	43.7 (1.72)
Average precipitation days (≥ 1.0 mm)	0.1	0.4	0.6	0.1	0.1	0.5	0.2	0.2	0.0	0.1	0.5	0.5	3.3
Source: Starlings Roost Weather
