= Al Lakbi =

Al Lakbi اللكبي Lakabi, Liqbi
- Village
- Location in Oman
- Coordinates: 18°12′44″N 56°32′54″E
- Country: Oman
- Governorate: Al Wusta Governorate
- Wilayat (province): Al Jazer

Area
  - Total: 6.2 km^{2} (2.4 sq mi)

Population (2020)
  - Total: 979
  - Density: 158/km^{2} (410/sq mi)
- Time zone: UTC+4 (Oman Standard Time)

Al Lakbi, Lakabi, or Liqbi (Arabic: اللكبي, romanized: Al-Lakbī) is a village in Al Jazer, Al Wusta Governorate, in southern Oman. As of the 2020 Omani census, it had a population of 979. Since 2010, it has had an average growth rate of 2.7% per year. It has a health center.
