= Nawaf Saud Al Sabah =

Kuwaiti CEO and member of royal family

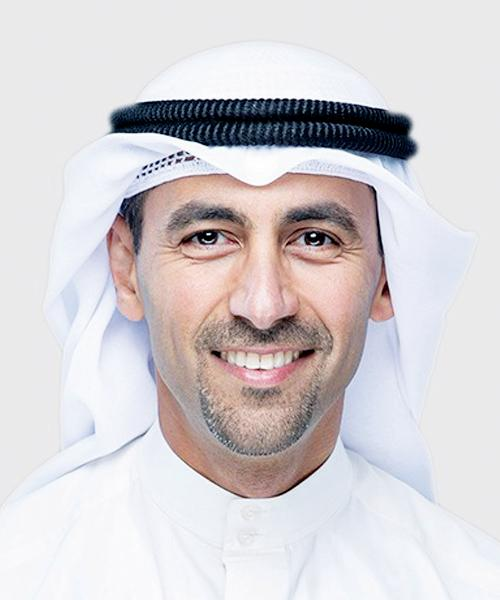

Nawaf Saud Al Sabah (Arabic نواف سعود الصباح born July 1971) is the deputy chairperson of the board and CEO of Kuwait Petroleum Corporation.

== Early life and education ==
Nawaf Saud Al Sabah was born in Kuwait in July 1971 into the Al Sabah ruling family. He received his undergraduate degree from Princeton School of Public and International Affairs and a Juris Doctor from Harvard Law School.

== Career ==
Prior to joining KPC in 1999, Nawaf worked as a corporate attorney at Gibson, Dunn & Crutcher LLP. From 2013 to 2019, Nawaf served as CEO of the Kuwait Foreign Petroleum Exploration Company (KUFPEC). In 2015, the Oil Minister of Kuwait ordered Nawaf to switch positions with the CEO of KOC, a subsidiary of KPC, but this was rejected by the CEO of KPC, arguing it was not within the authority of the minister. Earlier, he held roles within KPC, including Deputy Managing Director and General Counsel. Previously, he served as president and CEO of KPC Holdings (Aruba) AEC from 2019 to 2022. In March 2022, Nawaf was appointed deputy chairman and chief executive officer of Kuwait Petroleum Corporation. Nawaf also serves on the board of directors of the Oxford Institute for Energy Studies and the Public Authority for Industry.
