= Nafta (oil company) =

Nafta was an oil distribution chain owned by the Soviet Union but operated abroad.

In the 1920s, a Nafta chain operated in Sweden, before being sold to Gulf Oil in 1937. In the United Kingdom and Belgium a petrol chain was built up in the 1960s, with the British service stations being sold to Q8 in 1987.

NAFTA (UK) was originally called Russian Oil Storage Installations. Another Soviet-owned company in the United Kingdom which shared directors with Nafta was Russian Oil Products Limited (established in 1924 and struck off in 2018).
