= Kuwait Oil Tanker Company =

- Native name: شركة ناقلات النفط الكويتية
- Company type: State-owned enterprise
- Industry: Maritime transport
- Founded: 1957
- Headquarters: Kuwait City, Kuwait
- Parent: Kuwait Petroleum Corporation
- Website: www.kotc.com.kw

Kuwait Oil Tanker Company (KOTC) is a Kuwaiti state-owned maritime company specializing in the transportation of crude oil, petroleum products, and liquefied petroleum gas (LPG). It operates as a subsidiary of Kuwait Petroleum Corporation (KPC), the state-owned holding company responsible for Kuwait's hydrocarbon sector.

== History ==
Kuwait Oil Tanker Company was established in 1957 to support Kuwait's oil export operations and to develop a national fleet for maritime transportation.

During the Iraqi invasion of Kuwait in 1990, a significant portion of the company's fleet was affected. Following the liberation of Kuwait in 1991, KOTC undertook a fleet reconstruction and modernization program.

== Operations ==
KOTC provides maritime transportation services including:

- Crude oil transportation
- Refined petroleum product shipping
- Liquefied petroleum gas (LPG) transport
- Bunkering services

The company operates internationally, serving markets in Asia, Europe, and North America.

== Fleet ==
As of 2024, Kuwait Oil Tanker Company's fleet consists of crude oil carriers, product tankers, LPG carriers, and bunkering vessels.

=== Very Large Crude Carriers (VLCCs) ===
Vessel Name	Type	Year Delivered
Al Siddeeq	VLCC	2021
Al Kout	VLCC	2014
Al Yarmouk	VLCC	2014
Al Derwazah	VLCC	2014
Al Funtas	VLCC	2014
Al Riqqa	VLCC	2011
Al Salmi	VLCC	2011
Umm Al Aish	VLCC	2011
Dar Salwa	VLCC	2010
Al Jabriyah II	VLCC	2007
Kazimah III	VLCC	2006

=== Product Tankers ===
Vessel Name	Type
Sifsafah	Product Tanker
Shegardiah	Product Tanker
Al Adailiah	Product Tanker
Al Yamamah	Product Tanker
Mutriba	Product Tanker
Al Dasma	Product Tanker
Kaifan	Product Tanker
Bubyan	Product Tanker
Burgan	Product Tanker
Bneider	Product Tanker
Bahra	Product Tanker
Al Salam II	Product Tanker
Al Soor II	Product Tanker

=== LPG Carriers ===
Vessel Name	Type
Umm Al Rowaisat	LPG Carrier
Gas Al Ahmadiah	LPG Carrier
Gas Al Mubarakiah	LPG Carrier
Gas Al Negeh	LPG Carrier
Gas Al Kuwait II	LPG Carrier

=== Bunkering Vessels ===
Vessel Name	Type
Al Wataniah IV	Bunker Vessel
Sedra II	Bunker Vessel

== Ownership ==
KOTC is wholly owned by Kuwait Petroleum Corporation, the state-owned energy holding company of Kuwait.

== See also ==
- Kuwait Petroleum Corporation
- Energy in Kuwait
- Oil tanker
- Maritime transport
