= Kuwait Gulf Oil Company =

Kuwaiti Oil Company

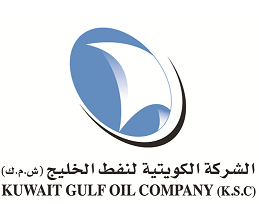

Agency overview
- Formed: February 2002; 24 years ago
- Headquarters: Al Ahmadi, Kuwait
- Agency executive: Bader Ahmad Al Munaifi, CEO
- Parent department: Kuwait Petroleum Corporation
- Website: www.kgoc.com

The Kuwait Gulf Oil Company (KGOC) is a national oil company in the State of Kuwait It manages Kuwait's share of the natural resources in the divided zone.

== History ==
Kuwait Gulf Oil Company (KGOC) was established in 2002, the company is responsible for managing and operating the State of Kuwait’s share of hydrocarbon resources located in the Divided Zone and the adjoining offshore area, in partnership with the Kingdom of Saudi Arabia. Through its mandate, KGOC plays a central role in supporting national energy security and contributing to Kuwait’s sustainable development objectives.

KGOC operates in collaboration with its Saudi counterparts through joint operations in the following:

·Khafji Joint Operations (KJO): in cooperation with Aramco Gulf Operations Company (AGOC)

·Wafra Joint Operations (WJO): in cooperation with Chevron Saudi Arabia

== Executive management ==
Official Title	Name	Period of service
First Chief Executive Officer (CEO) and General Manager in charge of Company Establishment	Eng. Mohammad Al-Jazaf	2002 – 2003
Chief Executive Officer	Abdulhadi Al- Awwad	2004 – 2005
Chief Executive Officer	Eng. Bader Naser Al-Khashti	2005 – 2008
Chief Executive Officer	Eng. Alsayed Hashem Mustafa Al-Refae	2008 – 2012
Chief Executive Officer	Eng. Ali Dughaim Al-Shammari	2013 – 2015
Chief Executive Officer	Eng. Abdulnaser Yousef Al-Fulaij	2016 – 2018
Acting Chief Executive Officer	Eng. Abdullah Ahmad Al-Sumaiti	2019 – 2020
Acting Chief Executive Officer	Eng. Imad Sultan	2020 – 2021
Acting Chief Executive Officer	Eng. Khaled Nayef Al- Otaibi	2021 – 2022
Acting Chief Executive Officer	Eng. Abdulwahab Mohammad Al-Mithin	2024 – 2025
Acting Chief Executive Officer	Eng. Bader Ahmad Al-Munaifi	2025
Chief Executive Officer	Eng. Bader Ahmad Al-Munaifi	2025 - present

== Operations And production ==
Khafji Operations

Daily production reached 128,000 barrels as of April 2024, and the first phase of the new gas pipeline to Mina Ahmadi refinery was completed.

Wafra Operations

Average production reached 77,520 barrels per day in 2024, while 51 new wells were drilled as part of the ongoing development plan.

Gas and Energy

Delivery of 22 million standard cubic feet per day to Kuwait Oil Company (KOC), along with the commissioning of the Gas Mitigation Project with a capacity of 32 MMSCFD.

== Strategic Projects ==
· Al-Durra Offshore Field: A key strategic project currently under development

· Gas Mitigation Project: capacity of 32 million standard cubic feet per day (MMSCFD)

· Natural Gas Export: Export capacity of 22 million standard cubic feet per day to Kuwait Oil Company (KOC)

== Infrastructure ==
The company has an integrated infrastructure that include:

· Production and processing facilities

· Pipeline networks

· Gas facilities

· Administrative and technical facilities

· Digital infrastructure (SCADA systems)

== Digital Transformation ==
Kuwait Gulf Oil Company has adopted a comprehensive digital transformation strategy aimed at enhancing operational efficiency and improving performance across all its sectors. This strategy focuses on integrating modern technologies into the management of oil fields and projects, raising safety levels, reducing emissions, and improving decision-making through data and smart analytics.

Digital transformation initiatives include:

· Monitoring and control systems (SCADA)

Developing advanced digital systems to connect fields and operating facilities with centrally monitored networks in real time.

· Digital Twin

Building digital models of surface assets to predict failures and enhance preventive maintenance.

· Smart analytics (AI and Data Analytics)

Using artificial intelligence to analyze production and equipment data and to improve energy and operationl efficiency.

· Transition to paperless operations

Implementing electronic correspondence systems and digital document management within the overall institutional transformation framework.

· Cybersecurity

Strengthening electronic protection systems and monitoring the digital infrastructure in line with Kuwait Petroleum Corporation (KPC) standards.

· Smart operations

Using mobile devices and digital field systems to support personnel at work sites.

== Financial Data ==
The book value of the company’s total assets amounted to KWD 1.181 billion, according to the latest published financial statements.

== Employees ==
The company employs 805 staff members, with Kuwaitis representing 99.13% of the workforce.

== Social And Environmental Responsibility ==
The company applies the highest health, safety and environmental (HSSE) standards and implements sustainable initiatives that include:

· Reducing emissions

· Monitoring water and soil quality

· Using injection technologies and water recycling in oilfield operations

· Preserving wildlife in shared operating areas

· Implementing Zero Flaring programs to minimize flaring at production sites

== See also ==
- Petroleum industry in Kuwait
- Economy of Kuwait
- Kuwaiti oil fires
