= Kuwait Foreign Petroleum Exploration Company =

Kuwait Foreign Petroleum Exploration Company (KUFPEC)
- Company type: Subsidiary
- Industry: Oil and Gas
- Founded: April 1981
- Headquarters: Kuwait City, Kuwait
- Area served: Worldwide
- Products: Petroleum, Natural gas
- Services: Exploration, Development, Production
- Parent: Kuwait Petroleum Corporation (KPC)

Kuwait Foreign Petroleum Exploration Company (KUFPEC) is an international upstream company, which is a subsidiary of Kuwait Petroleum Corporation (KPC). The organization is involved in the discovery, expansion, and extraction of crude oil and natural gas outside Kuwait’s borders. KUFPEC operates in 10 nations across five continents, including Australia, Asia, Africa, North America, and Europe.

== History ==
It was founded in April 1981.

In June 2023, KUFPEC announced its plans to expand its regional presence and expand its footprint in Asia through its office in Kuala Lumpur, Malaysia. In November 2023, Polish state-controlled oil and gas group Orlin was in preliminary talks to buy KUFPEC's stake in producing assets on the Norwegian continental shelf. The deal was finalized later in the month, with KUFPEC selling all of its assets in Norway to Poland's Orlin, which operates in Norway as PGNiG Upstream, for $454 million.

== Operations ==
KUFPEC has discovered Jannah gas, condensate and oil fields in Yemen. It also discovered a new oil field in Egypt's Jessim and Tawila West Concession. In 2022, KUFPEC Indonesia B.V. discovered a new oil and gas reservoir in the Anambas-2X exploration well in the Anambas Block, Natuna Sea.
