= Haima, Oman =

Haima
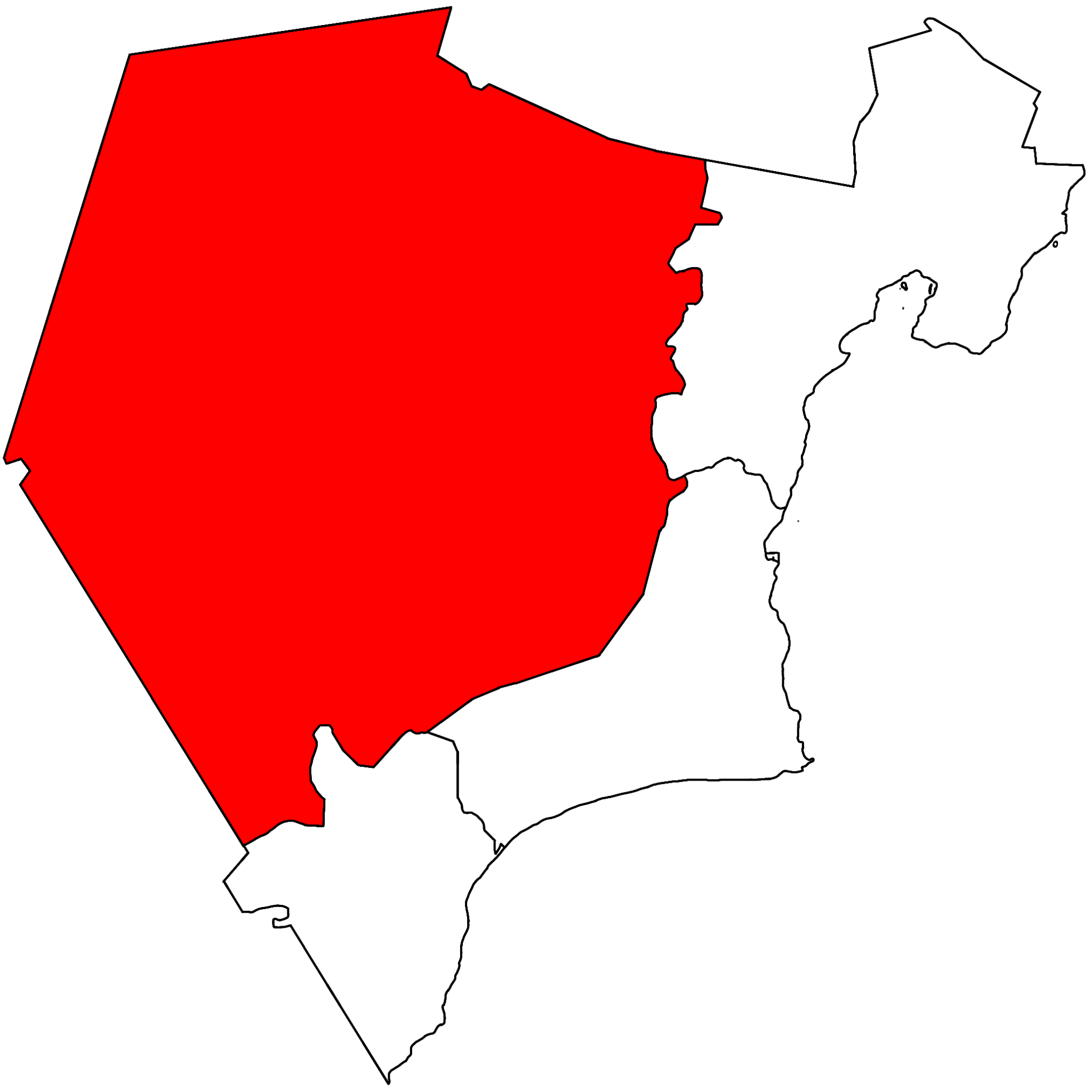
- The wilayat of Haima in the Al Wusta Governorate shaded red

- Location in Oman
- Coordinates: 19°57′25″N 56°16′33″E
- Country: Oman
- Region: Al Wusta Governorate (Oman)
- Wilayat: Haima

Population (2020-12-12)
  - Total: 7,814
- (Only the population for the town of Haima, not the entire wilayat, which had a population of 10,093)
- Time zone: UTC+4 (GST)

Haima (Arabic: هيماء, romanized: Haymā’) is a town located in and is the capital of the Al Wusta Governorate of Oman. In the 2020 Omani census, it had a population of 7,814.

Permanent settlement began after a team of oil explorers sunk a water well there. This well, along with another dug in al-Ajaiz, became the first permanent water sources in Jiddat il-Harasiis. The well in Haima was used less than that in al-Ajaiz on account of the poor grazing lands surrounding it.

In 1982, a school for boys and later one for girls was opened in Haima. Families from the Harasiis tribe have increasingly settled in this location while schools are in session.

== Climate ==
Haima has a hot desert climate (BWh) according to the Köppen climate classification. In Haima, the winters are brief, pleasant, dry, and primarily clear, while the summers are lengthy, hot, humid, desert, and partly cloudy. The average annual temperature ranges from 13 to 43 Celsius (56 to 110 degrees Fahrenheit), rarely falling below 10 or rising over 45 C (50 or 114 F).

The best times of year to visit Haima for hot-weather activities are from mid-March to mid-April and from early October to late November, according to the beach/pool score.

Climate data for Haima
Month	Jan	Feb	Mar	Apr	May	Jun	Jul	Aug	Sep	Oct	Nov	Dec	Year
Mean daily maximum °C (°F)	27.2 (81.0)	29.6 (85.3)	32.7 (90.9)	39.3 (102.7)	42.9 (109.2)	44.1 (111.4)	42.1 (107.8)	42.1 (107.8)	39.6 (103.3)	36.6 (97.9)	33.1 (91.6)	28.9 (84.0)	36.5 (97.7)
Daily mean °C (°F)	19.8 (67.6)	21.9 (71.4)	25.1 (77.2)	30.5 (86.9)	34.1 (93.4)	35.6 (96.1)	35.1 (95.2)	33.8 (92.8)	31.7 (89.1)	28.8 (83.8)	25.6 (78.1)	21.8 (71.2)	28.7 (83.6)
Mean daily minimum °C (°F)	12.3 (54.1)	14.1 (57.4)	17.4 (63.3)	21.6 (70.9)	25.2 (77.4)	27.1 (80.8)	28.0 (82.4)	25.4 (77.7)	23.7 (74.7)	21.0 (69.8)	18.1 (64.6)	14.6 (58.3)	20.7 (69.3)
Average precipitation mm (inches)	0.0 (0.0)	0.0 (0.0)	0.2 (0.01)	2.5 (0.10)	6.3 (0.25)	1.4 (0.06)	0.5 (0.02)	0.6 (0.02)	0.7 (0.03)	0.0 (0.0)	1.1 (0.04)	0.4 (0.02)	13.7 (0.55)
Source: http://www.world-climates.com/city-climate-haima-oman-asia/

== Natural reserves ==
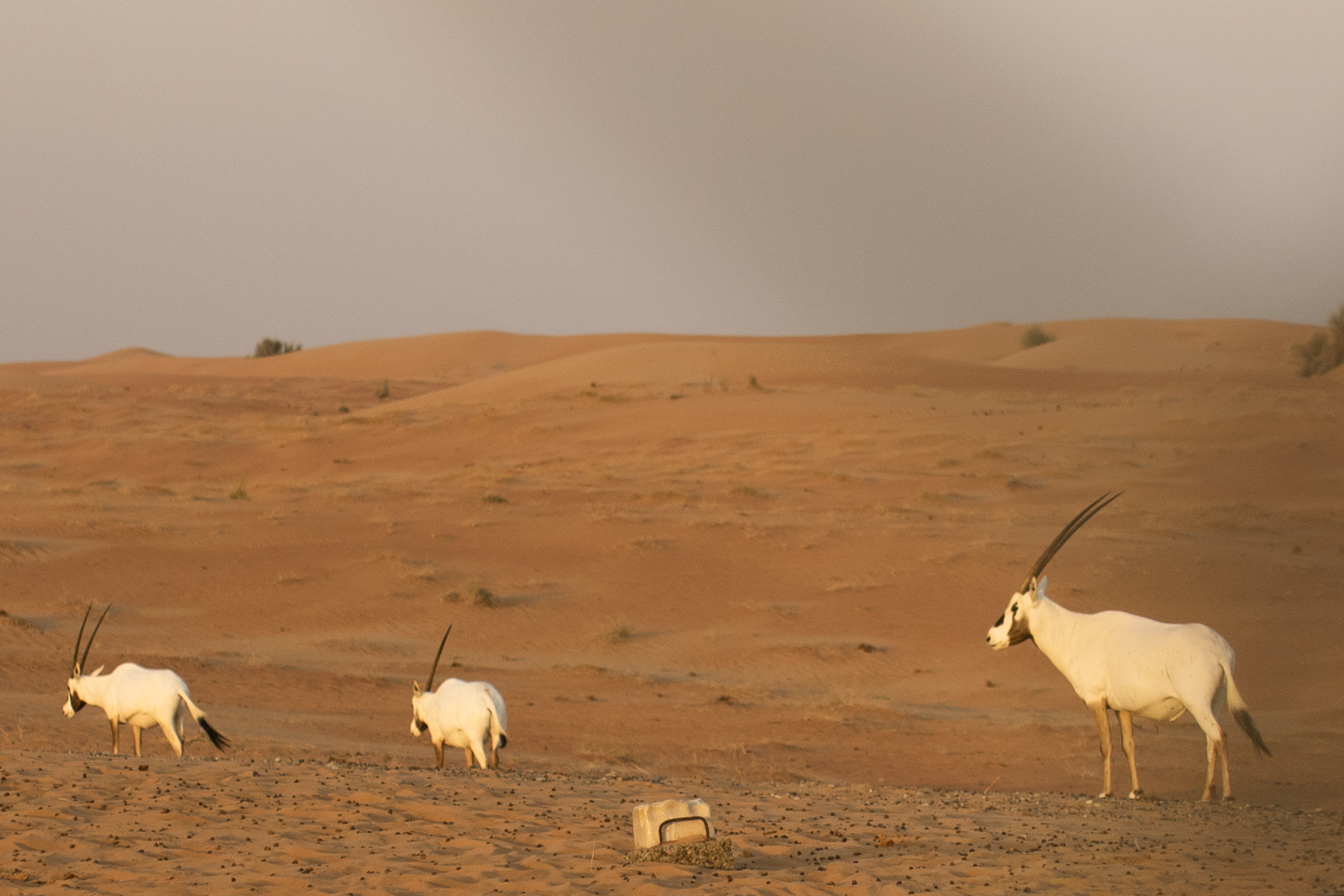
Arabian Oryx Reserve

The Wilayat of Hema is well known for its natural reserves since, unlike other areas of the Sultanate, it is home to several rare and wild species, including gazelles and the Arabian oryx (Ibn Sula), which can be found in the Jalouni region (Arabian Oryx Reserve). The United Nations Educational, Scientific, and Cultural Organization (UNESCO) has it listed as a world heritage site.

== Caves ==
In addition, a collection of caverns, the most notable of which is the "Al-Raki" cave, can be found northeast of Jalouni. It has a flow of water inside, however it is unfit for consumption. There is also a cave named "Wadi Saraf" that is accessible through an aperture connected to a sloping corridor and is situated on a slope below ground level. Despite not seeing anything within, you can feel that this cave has water.

There is a fourth cave that they refer to as "Kattar," and while it has water, it is unfit for drinking. Three springs of water can be found in addition to the caverns, one of which is known as "Buy Al-Hawja" and is a sizable boulder that rests on a stone foundation and resembles a natural canopy. The third eye is known as the "horn of Anuz," and this "horn" is distinguished by the presence of salt dunes. It also resembles a natural umbrella.

== Economic activities ==
The residents of the Wilayat of Haima engage in a number of activities, such as trade, livestock breeding, and the textile industry. Among its musical arts are Al-Razha, Al-Azi, and Al-Taghrood.

== See also ==
- List of cities in Oman
