= Kuwait Petroleum Corporation =

State-owned oil company of Kuwait

- The headquarters of Kuwait Petroleum Corporation in Gulf Street
- Native name: مؤسسة البترول الكويتية
- Type: State-owned
- Industry: Petroleum
- Founded: January 27, 1980; 46 years ago
- Founder: State of Kuwait
- Headquarters: Al Kuwait, Kuwait
- Area served: Worldwide
- Key people: Sheikh Nawaf Saud Al-Nasir Al-Sabah (CEO)
- Products: Petroleum
- Revenue: KWD 30.06 billion (FY 2024/25); US$ 97.9 billion
- Net income: KWD 1.36 billion (FY 2024/25); US$ 4.43 billion
- Owner: State of Kuwait (100%)
- Subsidiaries: Kuwait Oil Company (100%); Kuwait National Petroleum Company (100%); Petrochemical Industries Company (100%); Kuwait Petroleum International (100%); Kuwait Foreign Petroleum Exploration Company (100%); Kuwait Gulf Oil Company (100%)
- Website: www.kpc.com.kw

Kuwait Petroleum Corporation (Arabic: مؤسسة البترول الكويتية; KPC) is Kuwait's national state-owned oil company, headquartered in Kuwait City.

The activities of Kuwait Petroleum Corporation are focused on petroleum exploration, production, petrochemicals, refining, marketing, and transportation. KPC produces about 7% of the world's total crude oil.

== History ==
In 1934 KPC received the first Kuwait Oil Concession Agreement after it was originally formed by the Gulf Oil Corporation and the Anglo-Persian Oil Company. In 1975 the state signed agreements with BP and Gulf and after its shares were progressively increased, Kuwait Petroleum Corporation was founded on 27 January 1980 as an umbrella company, integrating KOC, KNPC, KOTC and PIC and effectively placing them under government control. Between 1983 and 1987 KPC acquired most of Gulf Oil's refining operations in Western Europe. In 1992 KPC began to operate in Spain and in 1994 the company acquired BP's Luxembourg assets.

In May 2013 Nizar Al-Adsani was appointed chief executive officer of the corporation. In December 2018 Hashem Hashim was appointed as chief executive officer.

In January 2020, Kuwait Petroleum Corporation and QatarEnergy signed a 15-year sale and purchase agreement for the supply of up to 3 million tonnes of LNG to Kuwait annually. The agreement was signed in order to meet Kuwait's growing energy needs and the LNG delivery will begin from 2022. In March 2020, KPC announced that it and all of its subsidiaries were to cut capital and operational spending for the year since the COVID-19 pandemic caused a decline in oil supply and prices. CEO Hashem stated that the KPC was implementing ways to preserve public funds also beneficial to Kuwait, after the government reduced spending in the energy sector. The cancellation of the Al-Dabdaba solar plant came in July 2020, which would have provided 15 percent of the electrical energy needed in the oil sector.

In August 2020, KPC agreed to cut $2.3 billion from the spending budget of the oil sector for the 2020-2021 fiscal year. KPC agreed to a loan in October 2020, from the National Bank of Kuwait (NBK) and Kuwait Finance House for $3.27 billion.

In December 2020, KPC signed a lease with Japan's Ministry of Economy, Trade and Industry for 3.14 million barrels of oil to be stored at Kiire station starting in the first quarter of 2021.

As the coronavirus-driven oil price changes continued on, the KPC went into negotiations with Kuwait's General Reserve Fund (GRF) to set up a payment schedule for US$20 billion which will be carried out over the course of over 15 years. An additional $20 billion was also negotiated to be borrowed over the course of 5 years to cover KPC's deficits. A yearly payment of US$1.83 billion was agreed upon in April 2021, the KPC has the option to pay back more per year depending on where the company stands financially.

KPM received a compensation pay out in July 2021, amounting to US$14.7 billion, for losses in production and sales due to the 1990-91 Iraqi invasion. The United Nation panel approved over 1.5 million claims related to the government and international organisations involved in the invasion.

In March 2022, Nawaf Saud al-Sabah was appointed the new CEO. He joined the company in 1999 and held many positions over the years, including the head of KPC's Washington Office and CEO of KUFPEC, a subsidiary of KPC.

In February 2024, the KPC initiated a mangrove planting project together with SLB and the Kuwait Oil Company. The project is intended to be part of the KPC 2050 energy transformation strategy plan.

The KPC found an estimated 800 million barrels of medium-density oil as well as 600 billion in standard cubic feet of associated gas at the Al-Jlaiaa offshore field in January 2025.

With the ongoing regional conflict with Iran in 2026, KPC placed a precautionary oil output reduction on its refining and production on 7 March.

Only a few days later, the KPC put a temporary suspension of production at the Mina Abdullah and Mina Al-Ahmadi refineries due to drone attacks.

== Production ==
KPC planned to achieve crude oil production capacities in Kuwait of 3.0 million barrels per day by 2010, 3.5 million barrels per day by 2015 and 4.0 million barrels per day by 2020. Its revenue was US$251.94 billion in 2014. KPC plans to achieve crude oil production capacities of 4,000,000 barrels per day (640,000 m^{3}/d) by 2020. Within the first week of March 2020, KPC managed to export 2 million barrels of crude.

In February 2021, KPC announced that oil production would be reduced and that supply contracts with Indian and Japanese buyers would be shortened to nine months, ending in December, instead of going for the full 12 months to March 2022. The Al Zour Refinery is planned to open by the end of the year, which would allow the KPC to once again supply more oil and return the contracts to a 12-month length in 2022. The refinery will provide 615,000 barrels of oil per day, and it will be the fourth in the country. In December, KPC decided to extend the supply contracts back to March 2022, after the commissions for the Al-Zour refinery were delayed.

In March 2022, Kuwait and Saudi Arabia signed documents to start developing the Durra Gas field, located between the two states, and production there is expected to reach 84,000 barrels a day.

Al-Zour refinery was officially opened on 29 May 2024, with an inauguration ceremony attended by Emir Mishal Al-Ahmad Al-Jaber Al-Sabah.

In July 2024, KPC discovered oil in the Al-Nokhatha field which is equivalent to 3.2 billion barrels.

== Products ==
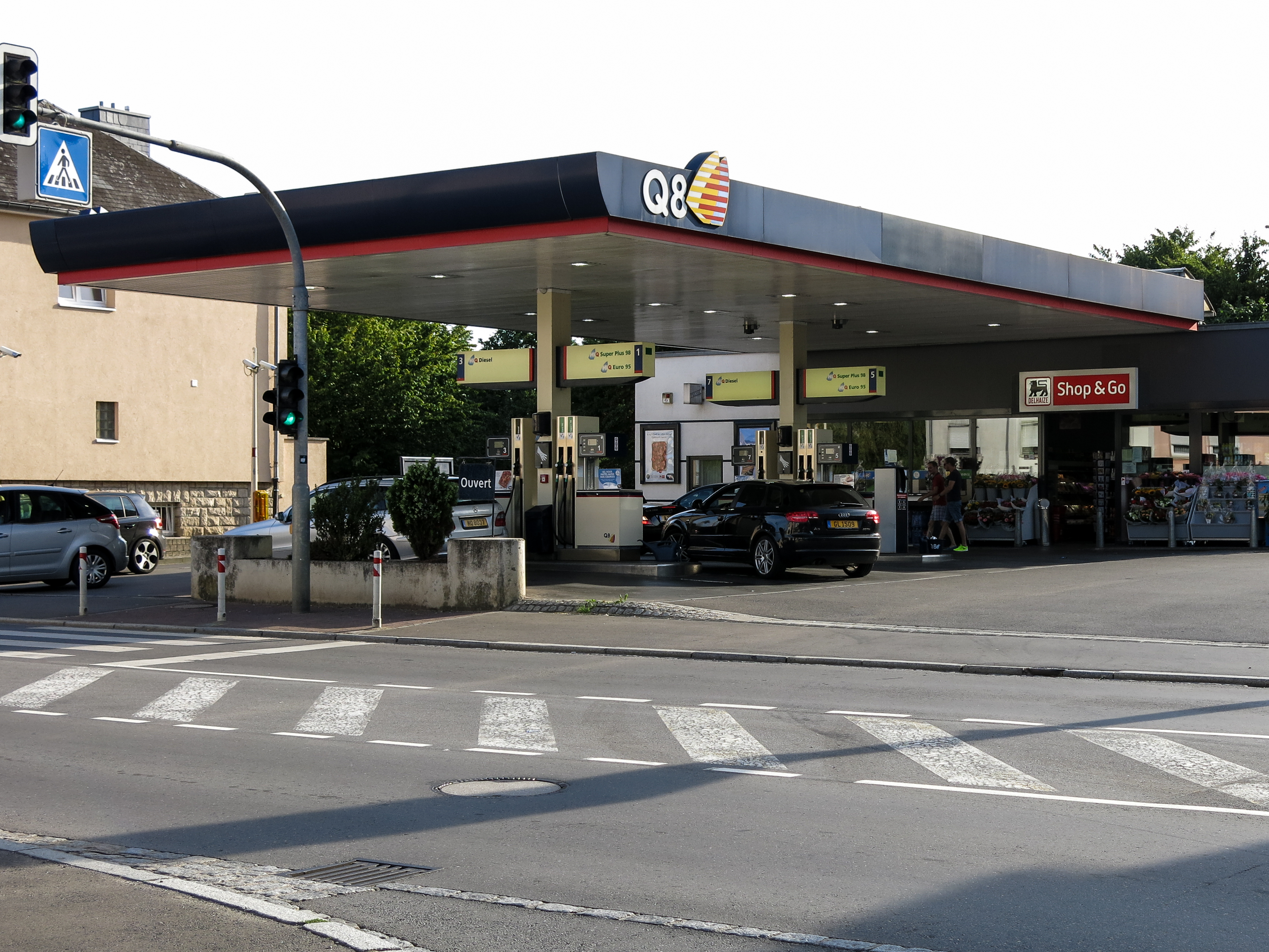
A Q8 petrol station in Hesperange, Luxembourg

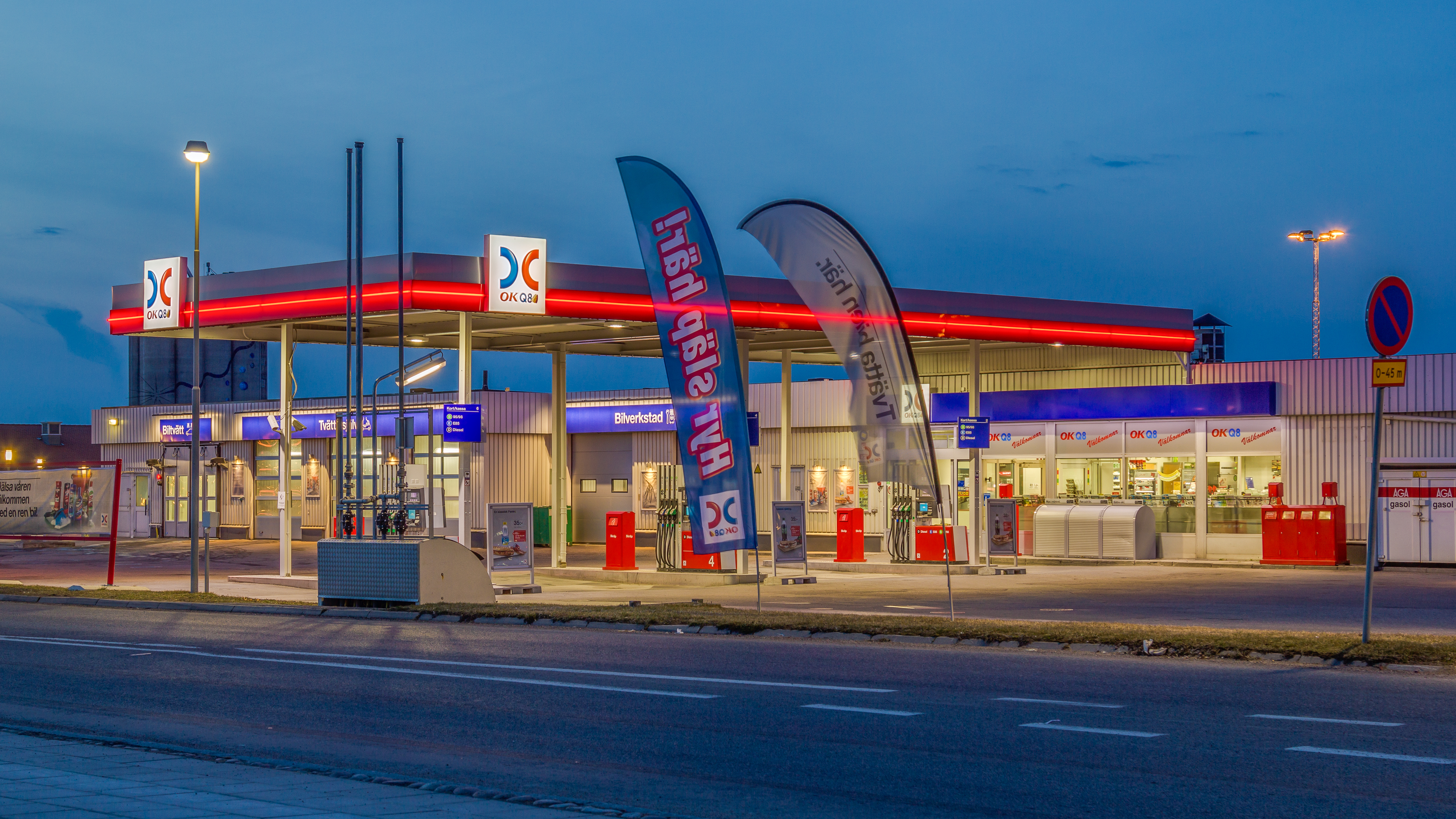
An OKQ8 petrol station in Hedemora, Sweden

The company's products have been sold in some countries under a subsidiary's name Q8. In Europe, Q8 has a network of more than 4,400 service stations across six countries: Italy, Denmark, Belgium, the Netherlands, Luxembourg and, in Sweden, as the OKQ8 joint venture.

In Scandinavia, Q8 runs 186 service stations, and 54 unmanned (under the F24 brand) in Denmark. In Sweden, a subsidiary of KPC, KPI-Q8's gas stations are known as OKQ8 – a result of a merger between Q8 and Swedish OK, more than 900 is available, most of them unmanned.

In the Benelux, Kuwait Petroleum has a refinery in Europoort, Rotterdam, and is a partner in the Maasvlakte Olie Terminal, and runs 146 gas stations in the Netherlands. There are 404 Q8 stations in Belgium. Q8's large share of the Belgian market is due to the acquisition of Belgian BP offices in 1998 and the Aral stations in 1999. However, over the years, Q8 has closed many stations in residential areas and near apartment complexes. Like its competitors, Q8 also has a network of unmanned gas stations called Q8 Easy. In Belgium, Q8 has formed a partnership of sorts with Delhaize Shop & Go. This is a small convenience store where ready-to-use and on-the-go products are sold. However, it still is able to offer a wide variety of automotive services. They have extensive hours, and are often combined with a Panos Corner bakery.

There are no more Q8 stores in the UK, after being bought out in 2004 by a joint venture company Refined Holdings, which was formed specifically for the sale. The Q8 brand has since then been phased out of the UK.

Kuwait Petroleum Corp., the state-run oil company, sold its crude oil at $3.95 a barrel below the regional benchmarks, the biggest discount since December 2008, Bloomberg reported 11 Dec. 2014. Saudi Arabia and Iraq also cut oil prices for Asia following the Organization of Petroleum Exporting Countries' decision to maintain production levels, which ensured that global oil prices would stay low. It seemed likely that Middle Eastern countries were lowering prices to defend their market shares. Kuwait has sold crude oil to Asia at a discount since at least 2000.

In May 2024, KPC renewed its supply contract with Unipec for 300,000 barrels per day until 2033.

The KPC signed an MoU in June 2024 with the Korea National Oil Corporation (KNOC) for the storage of 4 million barrels of oil in Ulsan city.

== Subsidiaries ==
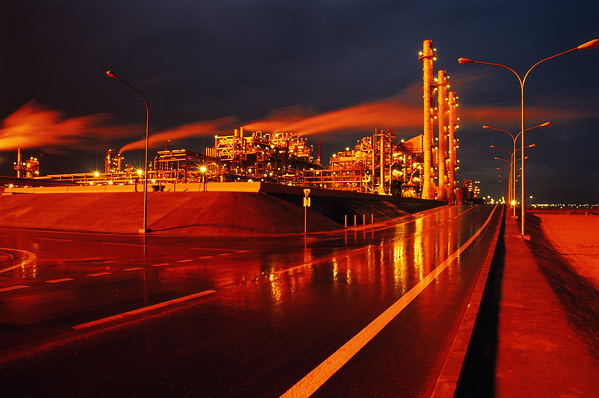
An oil refinery in Mina-Al-Ahmadi, Kuwait.

The subsidiary companies of KPC are:

- Kuwait Oil Company (KOC)
- Kuwait National Petroleum Company (KNPC)
- Petrochemicals Industries Company (PIC)
- Kuwait Oil Tanker Company (KOTC)
- Kuwait Foreign Petroleum Exploration Company (KUFPEC)
- Kuwait Petroleum International (KPI – Q8)
- Kuwait Gulf Oil Company (KGOC)
- Kuwait Integrated Petroleum Industries Company (KIPIC)

== Environmental concerns ==
In March 2023 Kuwait Oil Company (KOC), a subsidiary of the state-owned Kuwait Petroleum Corporation, declared a “state of emergency” after an oil spill on land in the west of the country.

== KIPIC ==
Kuwait Integrated Petrochemical Industries Company (KIPIC) was established on 18 October 2016 as a new subsidiary to Kuwait Petroleum Corporation (KPC). KIPIC is responsible for operating and managing the largest grassroot integrated complex for refining, petrochemicals manufacture businesses and liquefied natural gas import facilities at Al-Zour complex.

== Merger ==
In April 2025, Kuwait Petroleum Corporation (KPC) announced the merger of the Kuwait National Petroleum Company (KNPC) with the Kuwait Integrated Petroleum Industries Company (KIPIC).

== See also ==
- List of companies of Kuwait
