= Al Jazer =

- Wilayat
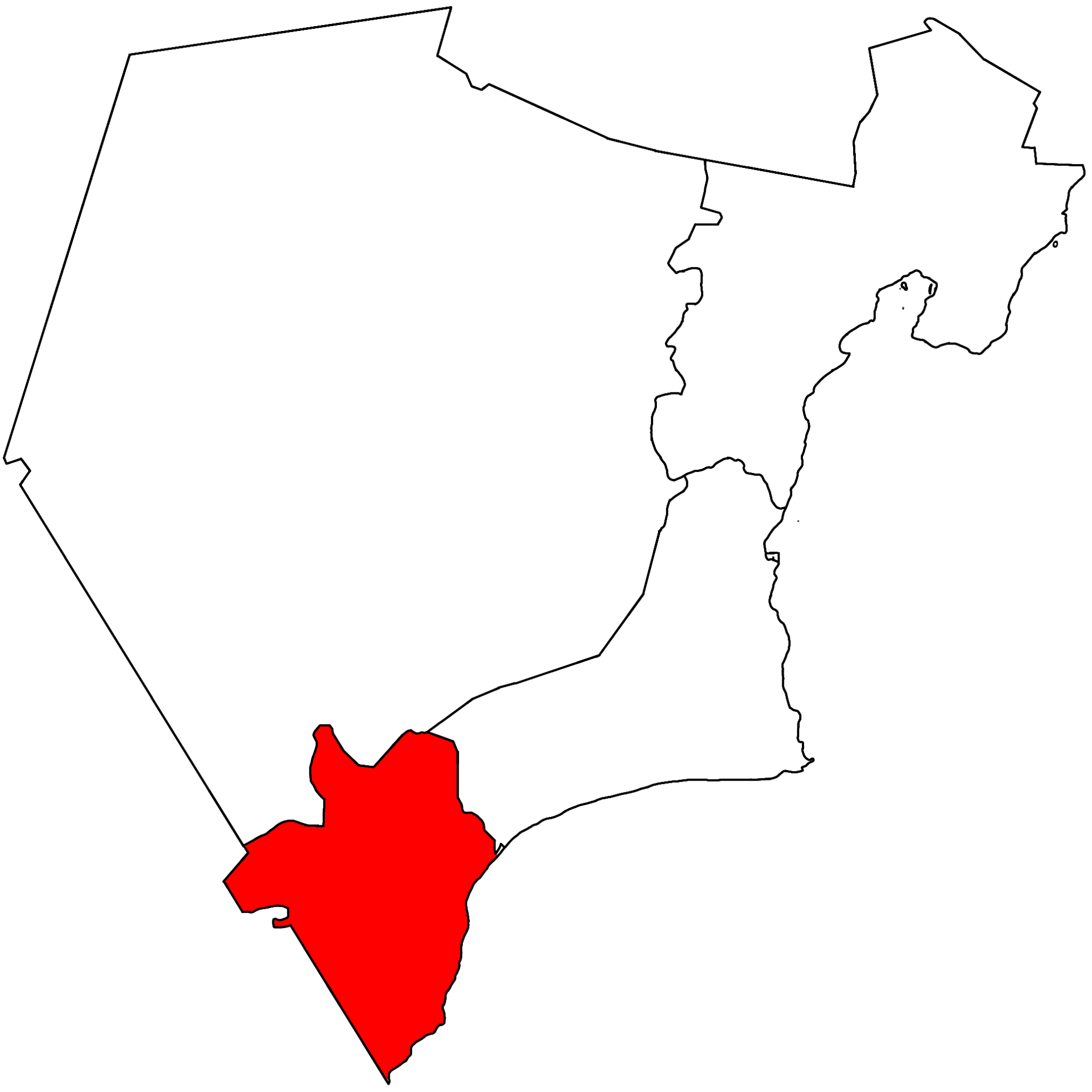
- The wilayat of Al Jazer in the Al Wusta Governorate shaded red

- Location within Oman
- Country: Oman
- Governorate: Al Wusta

Population (2020)
  - Total: 5,658

The Wilayat of Al-Jazer is located on the central region's coastline strip and is surrounded by states on most sides. It is bounded to the north by the Wilayat of Duqm, to the south by the Wilayat of Shilam, which is one of the states of the Omani Governorate of Dhofar, to the west by the Wilayat of Haima, and to the east by the Arabian Sea.

== People ==
Residents of the state used to build dark caves to live in until the year 1970. They built them of stones, one on top of the other, with no sticky materials. Because of climate change, storms, and other factors, the stones began falling, and caves were left without roofs, making the residents vulnerable from their conditions.

== Development ==
Modern housing has expanded throughout the state. There are schools, offices for services, and an office to assist the governor. The state also features an administrative and commercial complex comprising a collection of stores that provide the people with necessary resources.

== Climate ==
The climate in Al Jazer is classified as subtropical desert (BWh). The yearly temperature in the district is 32.09 °C, which is 2.89% higher than the national average. Al Jazer gets about 10.06 millimeters of rain per year and has 16.91 wet days (4.63% of the time).

== Tourist attractions ==
=== Beaches ===
Al-Jazer is known for its attractive environment since it is a coastal state with various beaches, the most significant of which is Lakbi. Lakbi is forty kilometers from Al-Kohal, the state's center. Mother Beach, Fadi Beach, and most of the state's beaches and prosecutors are among its beaches. With sophisticated equipment, many necessary services and residential spaces are provided.

=== Pink lakes ===
Pink lakes in the wilayat of Al-Jazer are among the most popular tourist attractions for visitors due to their unique color.

They are located 10 kilometers to the east of the wilayat's center. One is at the end of the paved road, and the other, about 1 kilometer north of the wilayat, is the largest and most beautiful. It is surrounded by green trees, which adds to its beauty.
