= Duqm =

Duqm ٱلدُّقْم (in Arabic) Ad-Duqm
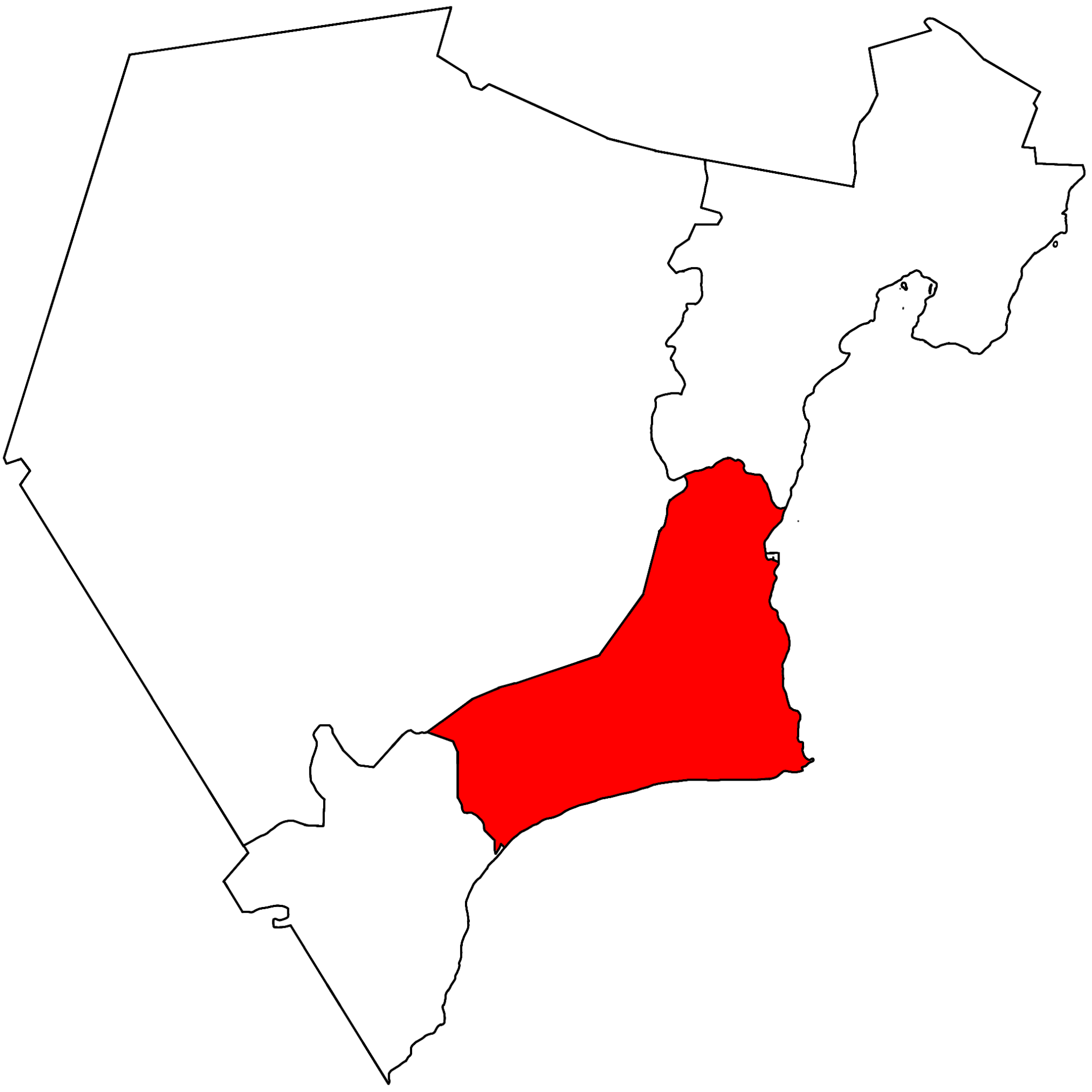
- The wilayat of Duqm in the Al Wusta Governorate shaded red

- Location in Oman
- Coordinates: 19°39′42″N 57°42′17″E
- Country: Oman
- Governorate: Al Wusta Governorate
- Wilayat: Duqm
- Time zone: UTC+4 (UTC+04:00)

Duqm (Arabic: ٱلدُّقْم, romanized: Ad-Duqm) is a port town in Oman in the Al Wusta governorate on the coastal strip of the Arabian Sea open to the Indian Ocean. It is about 550 km from Muscat. As of 2017, the population was approximately 12,000.

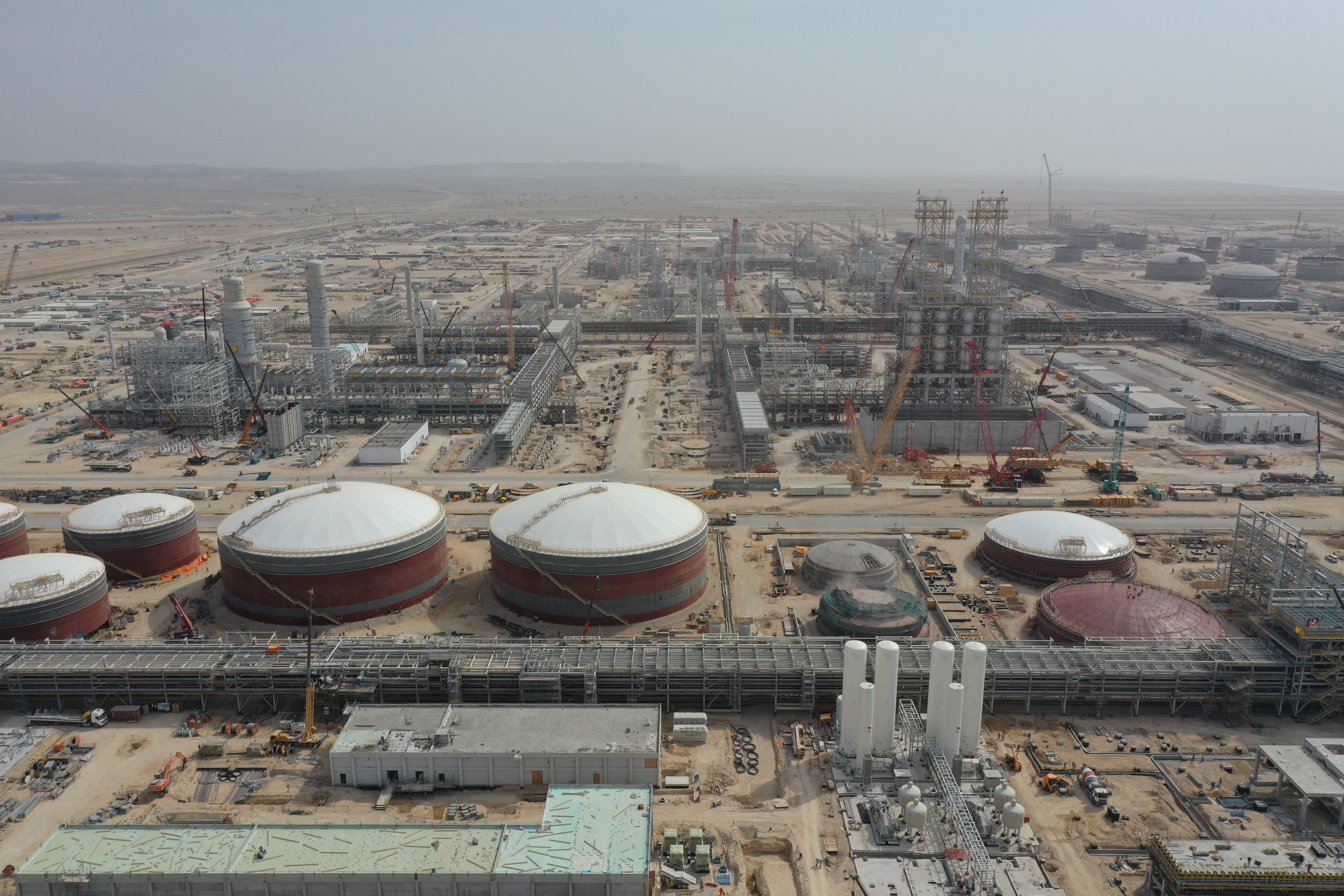
Duqm Refinery

== History ==
Duqm was a small fishing settlement on the coast of southern Oman, populated by the Janubah tribe. In February 1954, a party of soldiers of the Muscat and Oman Field Force and geologists of Petroleum Development Oman landed to begin oil exploration in central Oman.

Although Duqm was a fishing village until recently, in 2011 the Omani government launched plans to transform the town into an industrial hub and port city. During the 2010s Duqm grew at a breakneck pace; one resident said in 2018 that "five years ago there was nothing here."

=== Special Economic Zone at Duqm (SEZAD) ===
Duqm Fishing Port, located in the Special Economic Zone at Duqm (SEZAD), is the largest multi-purpose fishing port in the Sultanate of Oman, with an area of 600 hectares and a depth of 10 meters. Construction was completed in 2021. The main breakwater is 2.2 km long, the secondary breakwater is 1.1 km long and the total lengths of the jetties are around 1.2 km long.

Duqm Refinery, also located in SEZAD and occupying 900 hectares, is a large oil refinery under construction and expected to be begin commercial operations by the end of 2023.

Omani planners see Duqm as a potential alternative to other Gulf port cities such as Dubai, especially if routes through the Strait of Hormuz were to close.

== Touristic attractions ==
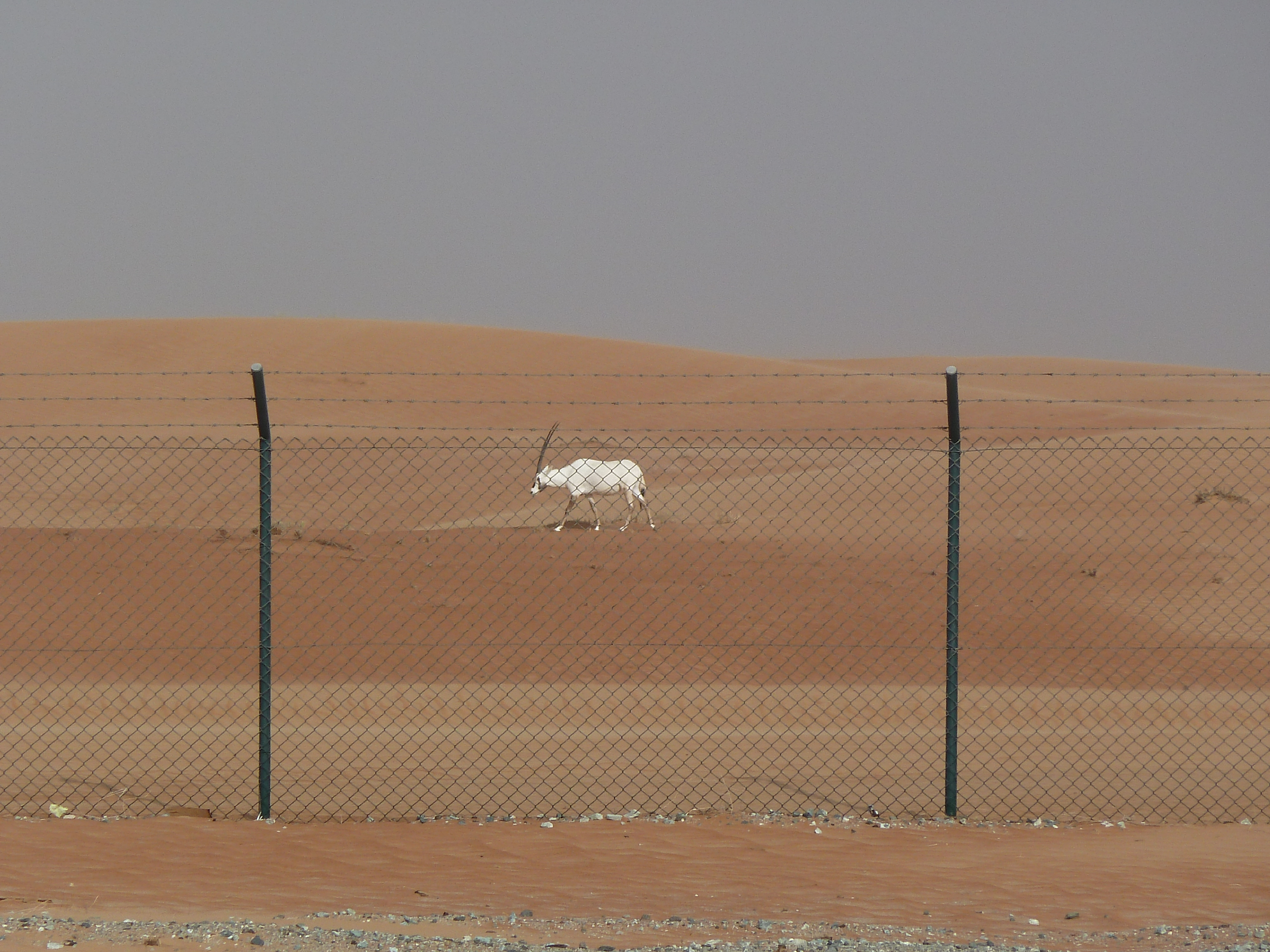
Oryx in Al Wusta Wildlife Sanctuary

=== Al Wusta Wildlife Sanctuary ===
Located along desert cliffs, this reserve is home to a small herd of oryx, and its breeding facility is home to a herd of over 600 animals. The reserve is located 80 kilometers from the Haima–Duqm route (Highway 37) via an unpaved route, and 110 kilometers from Haima. It is only accessible by four-wheel-drive vehicles and requires prior authorization.

=== Ras Madraka Beach ===
Ras Madraka Beach is about 80 kilometers south of the Park Inn Hotel in Duqm, and is known for its camping, fishing, surfing, and sea birds.

=== The Black Horn (Black Hill) ===
One of the best places for sightseeing and camping is a volcanic dam that is located in the middle of broad sand flats not far from Khalouf.

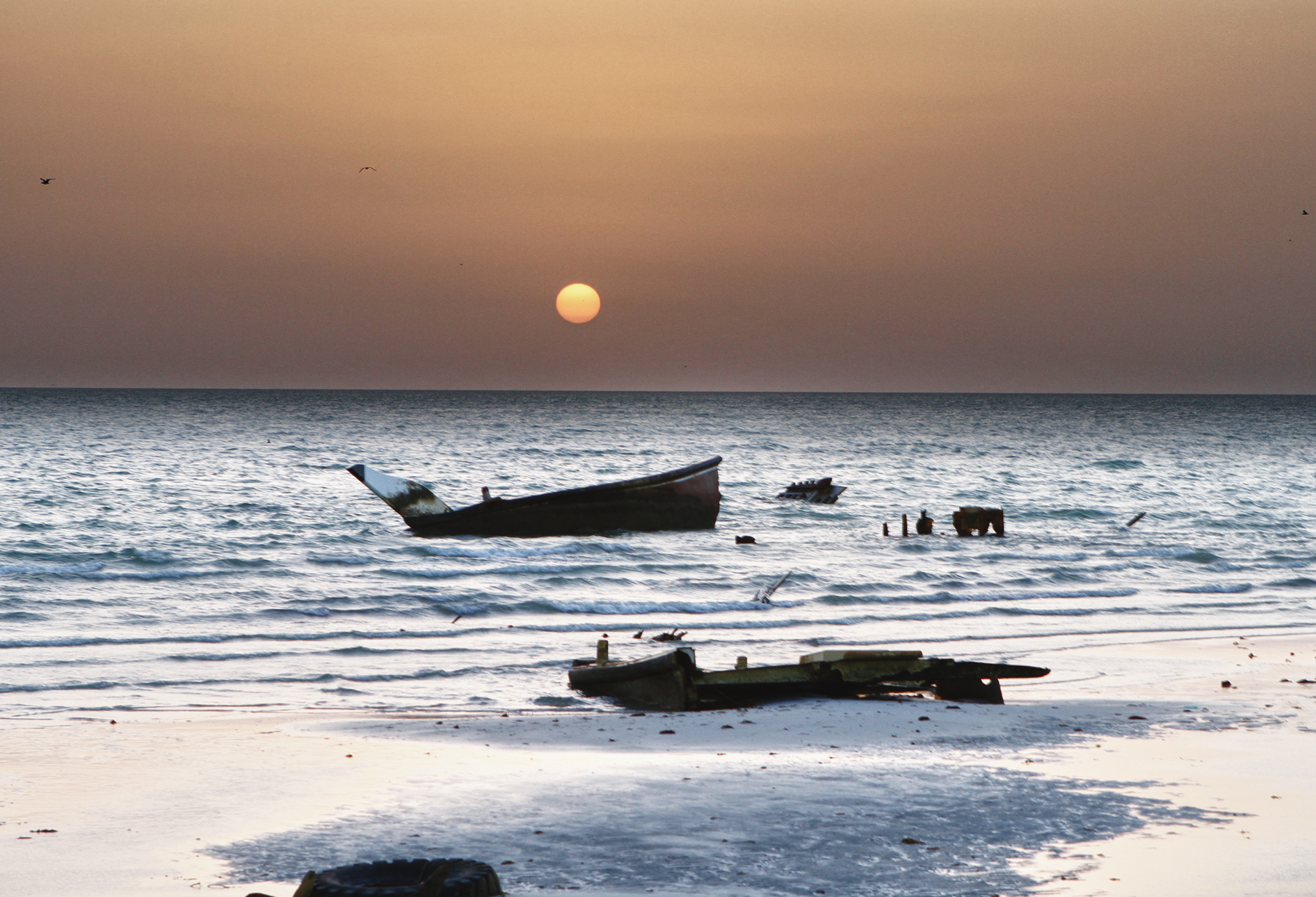
Masirah Island

=== Masirah Island ===
The island is a popular spot for windsurfers, sailors, and bird watchers, and is the habitat of several migrating turtle species.

=== Khalouf Beach ===
Due to the existence of soft white sand dunes near the village of Khalouf, which can only be reached by four-wheel-drive cars, Khalouf Sands is one of the most difficult locations for inexperienced drivers. Driving through the dunes is challenging because they are continually exposed to strong gusts from the ocean and are constantly shifting.

== Transportation ==
Duqm Airport was opened in 2014 and services flights to the nation's capital, Muscat. Bus services are also available, connecting Duqm with Muscat and Salalah. National Road 32 is the main north–south highway, passing through the west of Duqm.

== Climate ==
The weather in Duqm is dry and arid, receiving an average of 36 mm | 1.4 inches of precipitation annually. Its climate is BWh under the Köppen-Geiger classification. Duqm's yearly mean temperature is 26.7 °C (80.0 °F).

Climate data for Duqm
Month	Jan	Feb	Mar	Apr	May	Jun	Jul	Aug	Sep	Oct	Nov	Dec	Year
Mean daily maximum °C (°F)	26.8 (80.2)	27.5 (81.5)	30.4 (86.7)	34.3 (93.7)	36.2 (97.2)	36.3 (97.3)	33.0 (91.4)	32.4 (90.3)	32.5 (90.5)	32.7 (90.9)	30.5 (86.9)	27.6 (81.7)	31.7 (89.0)
Mean daily minimum °C (°F)	17.6 (63.7)	18.4 (65.1)	20.8 (69.4)	23.8 (74.8)	26.2 (79.2)	26.5 (79.7)	24.5 (76.1)	23.6 (74.5)	23.7 (74.7)	22.5 (72.5)	20.6 (69.1)	18.8 (65.8)	22.3 (72.1)
Average precipitation mm (inches)	2 (0.1)	5 (0.2)	7 (0.3)	10 (0.4)	0 (0)	3 (0.1)	1 (0.0)	4 (0.2)	0 (0)	1 (0.0)	1 (0.0)	2 (0.1)	36 (1.4)
Source: Climate-data.org

== See also ==
- Transport in Oman
