= Al Wusta Governorate (Oman) =

Governorate of Oman

Al Wusta Governorate The Central Governorate مُحَافَظَة ٱلْوُسْطَى
- Governorate
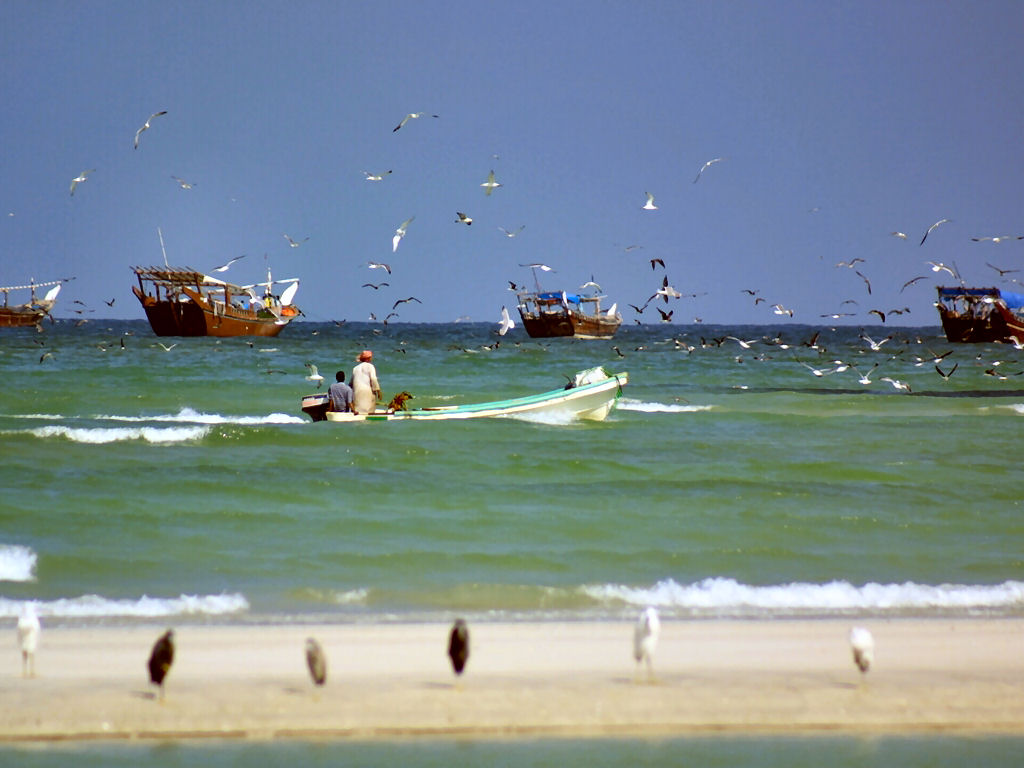
- Duqm

- Al Wusta Governorate in Oman shaded red

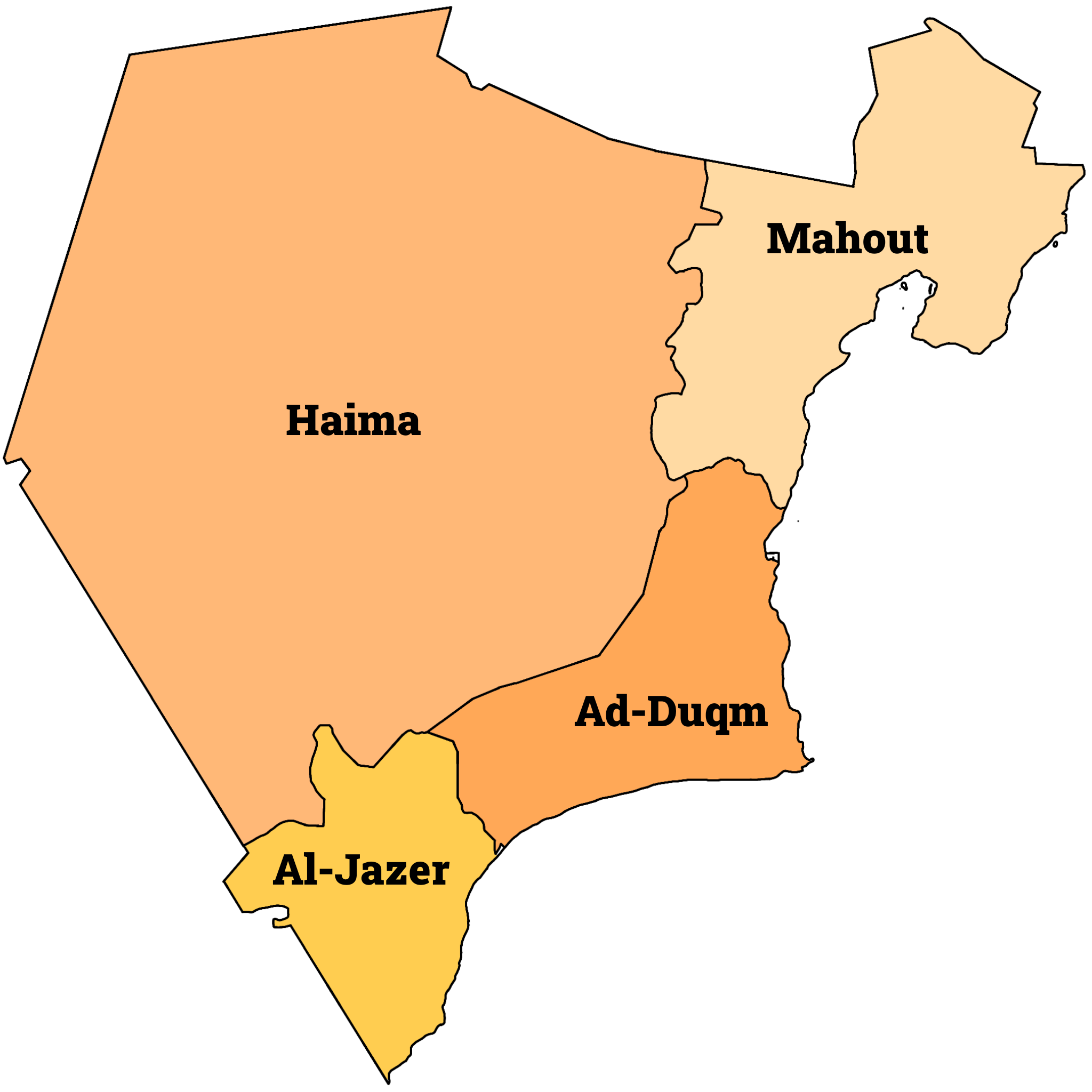
- The 4 wilayats of Al Wusta Governorate
- Coordinates: 20°N 56°E
- Country: Oman
- Established: 28 October 2011; 14 years ago
- Capital: Haima

Government
  - Governor: Mudhad bin Mohammed bin Abdullah Al Yaqoobi

Area
  - Total: 82,471 km^{2} (31,842 sq mi)

Population (2020 census)
  - Total: 52,344
  - Density: 0.63470/km^{2} (1.6439/sq mi)

Al Wusta Governorate (Arabic: مُحَافَظَة ٱلْوُسْطَى, romanized: Muḥāfaẓat Al-Wusṭā, lit. 'The Central Governorate') is the second biggest governorate of the 11 governorates of Oman which is approximately 82,471 km². Its capital city is Haima. It was previously a region ('mintaqah'), before becoming a governorate in 2011.

== Provinces ==
The region of Al Wusta Governorate consists of four 'Wilayat' (provinces):

- Haima
- Duqm
- Mahout
- Al Jazer

== Demographics ==
Historical population
Census year	Pop.	±% p.a.
1993	16,623	—
2003	22,983	+3.29%
2010	42,111	+9.04%
2020	52,344	+2.20%
Source: CityPopulation.de

== Health institutions ==
The region has numerous health institutions in each 'wilayat':

- Haima Hospital
- CDC Haima
- Al Ajaiz Health Centre
- Duqm Hospital
- Haitham Health Centre
- Ras Madrika Health Centre
- Mahout Health Centre
- Khloof Health Centre
- Nigda Health Centre
- Sorab Health Centre
- Al Jazir Hospital
- Liqbi Health Centre
- North Ghoubra Health Centre
- South Ghoubra Health Centre
