= Environmental issues in Kuwait =

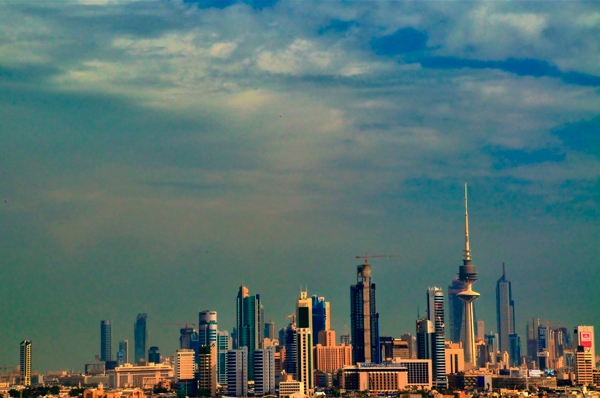
Kuwait City, Kuwait skyline

Located in the Middle East, Kuwait is a relatively small country that has been the center of many political and economic issues over the past few decades. Stemming from these tensions, Kuwait as well as other countries in the region, including Iran, Iraq, and Qatar face threats from environmental issues. A loss of agriculture due to climate change, pollution from the country's oil industry and Oil Fires of 1991 as well as damages to agriculture and biodiversity are just some of the common environmental issues. The Kuwaiti government has worked to mitigate and adapt to these issues through policy and the creation of agencies to research, educated and inform about environmental problems, their sources, and their effects.

== History of environmental issues in Kuwait ==
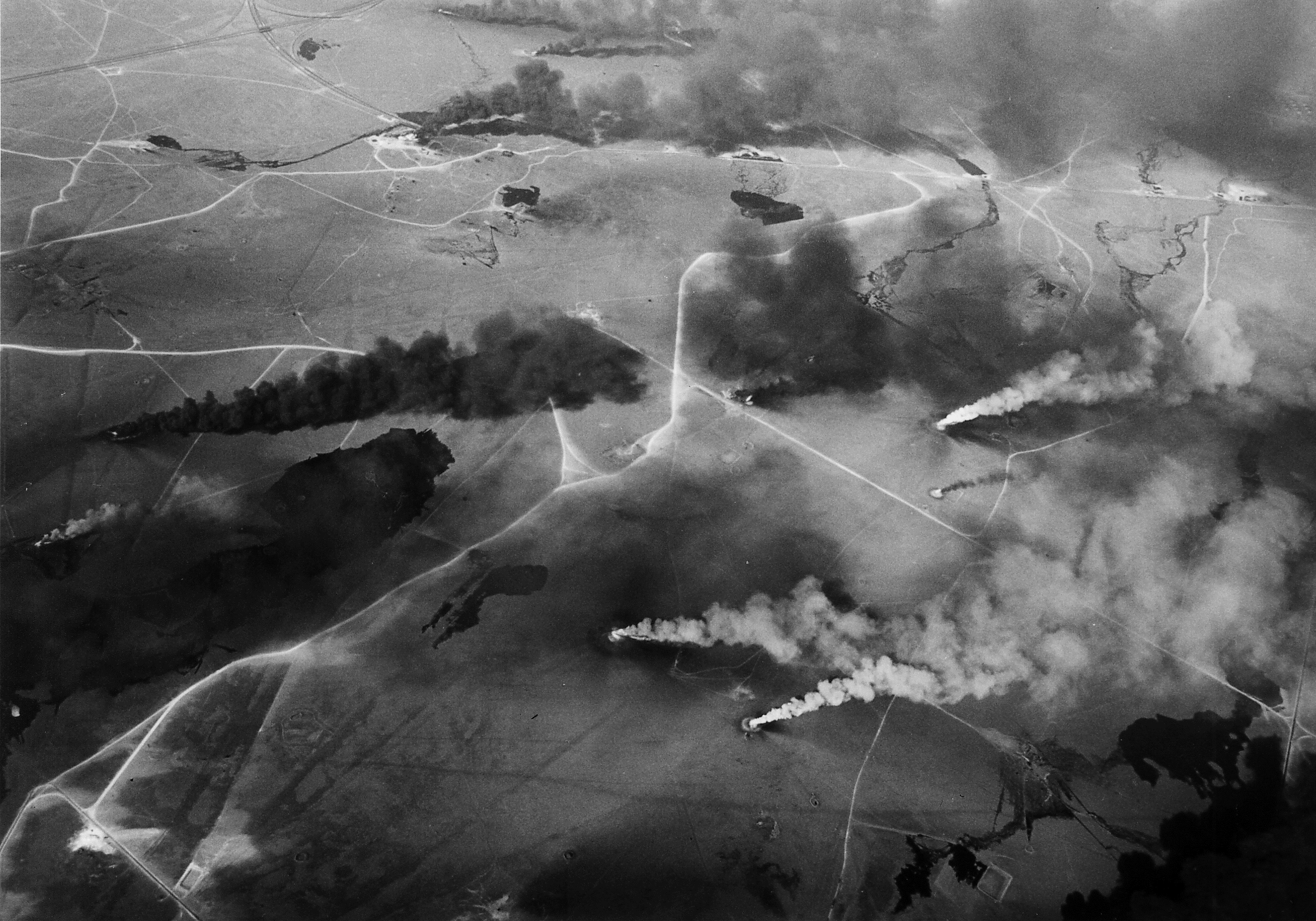
Kuwaiti Oil Fires in 1991 during the Gulf War

These environmental problems have impacted Kuwait individually as well as affected the country in coordination with each other. In light of the Gulf War, the Kuwaiti government, recovering from environmental as well as economic destruction, conducted research to learn more about these environmental problems including their sources effects, and possibilities for interconnectedness. A council of Kuwaiti researchers not only determined that the Oil Fires of 1991 caused a significant increase in aggregate air pollution but also killed species of animals as well as polluted soil and water sources that have long-standing implications. The same researchers determined that policies reversing these damages have limited effectiveness and feasibility given a lack of technology to clean air and water sources, as well as the permanency of species extinction and certain kinds of pollution. Kuwait, rather than dedicating time and money to cleaning up its depleted environment and ecosystems, focused on rebuilding its economy by subsidizing production costs for oil companies as well as cutting imports costs for countries buying oil. This dependency on oil drilling and exportation exacerbated a number of environmental issues including pollution and climate change. During the United Nations Framework Convention on Climate Change (UNFCCC) as well as the Kyoto, Copenhagen and Paris conventions, developed and developing countries scrutinized Kuwait for perpetually ranking among the highest contributors of greenhouse gas emissions while rebuilding its economy and disregarding global efforts to mitigate climate change and address renewable energy sources that would cut pollution and negative agricultural effects. The ultimate justification for this scrutiny was that Kuwait ratified UNFCCC in 1995 and the Kyoto Protocol in 2005, expressing systematic concern for environmental problems but made no tangible policy progress to address these problems.

In recent years, as the global community has become more aligned on environmental issues, Kuwait has taken steps, domestically and internationally, to address the country's environmental problems by enacting policies to regulate oil production and creating government bodies to regulate industries and policy effects, such as its own Environmental Protection Agency. Additionally, Kuwait has been more involved in international agreements, submitting an Intended Nationally Determined Contribution (INDC) during the Paris Convention, the first substantial climate change reform Kuwait had ever committed. However, continued stagnation regarding environmental issues continues to taint Kuwait's global image and pose significant health consequences for humans and nonhumans.

== Climate change ==
Climate change is a global environmental issue at the top of the international agenda. Despite opposition, its effects have been researched and substantiated by many scientists worldwide, including but not limited to the UNFCCC and the Intergovernmental Panel on Climate Change (IPCC). Current trends indicate that the Earth's climate will increase by an average of 4 °C by the year 2050. In Kuwait, researchers have concluded that current trends of activity in the region, mainly stemming from Kuwait's oil production, can cause a 1.6 °C increase in climate regionally by 2035 if no mitigation occurs.

Other effects from such an increase in climate include:

- a decrease of approximate 2 mm/year in rainfall by 2035 exacerbating droughts
- increases in dust storms
- a rise in sea-level along coastal regions, threatening urban infrastructure, lagoons and salt marshes

=== Climate Summit participation ===
The three global climate summits Kuwait has participated in include the UNFCCC Rio, the Kyoto Protocol, and the Paris Agreement. As part of the UNFCCC, Kuwait committed to joining a global coalition to achieve a 2 °C increase in the world's climate from pre-industrial levels by 2020. However, the country hadn't submitted any formal plan to managing or reducing levels of greenhouse gas emissions. Weak commitments, corner stoned by expensive pledges from developed countries, the UNFCCC served a greater purpose as an educational, focusing event around the issue of climate change rather than an event resulting in mobilization.

During the Kyoto Protocol, Kuwaiti delegates blamed the United States and the United Kingdom the environmental damages and fallout from the Gulf War. Again focused on a top-down approach to gaining strong, financially based commitments from developed countries, much of the developing world was not obligated or urged to join the global force. While Kyoto was regarded as a failure in creating a comprehensive agreement regarding climate change, Kuwait began to take steps towards mitigating climate change in hopes that visible mobility might garner a change in public perception as well as financial aid from the developing world. The most significant of these mitigation policies was the commission of a Kuwaiti environmental protection agency for the research, education, and creation of policy to address environmental issues, namely climate change.

Between the Kyoto Protocol and the Paris Agreement in 2015, many climate summits occurred including the conventions in Cartagena, Bali, and Copenhagen; however, Kuwait, while present, took no significant action or leadership in mitigating climate change on a global level. Domestically, many policies and regulations were greatly debated to no success, but this was a profound visibility change that was perceived as general stagnation.

Graph depicting Kuwaiti oil production, consumption, net imports and net exports

In 2015, Kuwait was again scrutinized about its consistent rank as one of the top contributors to greenhouse gas emissions. Some countries accused the Kuwaiti government of collusion with the Kuwaiti Oil Company, the country's primary economic catalyst since petroleum is Kuwait's biggest financial asset, accounting for over 50% of the country's gross domestic product, 94% of export revenues, and 90% of government income. Publicly denying collusion, the Kuwaiti delegation wanted to prove the international community wrong by signing onto a pioneering agreement. As part of the Paris Agreement, signatory countries submitted INDCs, public outlines of post-2020 climate action. These INDCs were formulated to maintain the convention's three main goals: "to keep the increase in average temperature to well below 2°C, to pursue efforts to limit increase to 1.5°C, and achieve net zero emissions in the second half of this century."

The Kuwaiti INDC, which has not yet been ratified as of 2016, states that the country will continue "business as usual" between 2020 and 2035, suggesting no significant ban or reduction in its oil production; however, the government said it would strive for sustainable economic development through projects and legislation to diversify its energy generation as well as explore jobs in the private sector, including technology. Wind and solar power generation have slowly become more common despite the excessive dependence on petroleum. Shortly after the Paris Agreement, the Kuwaiti government began an initiative through the creation of subsidies for natural gas to reduce emissions by almost 60% by 2020. The government also passed a domestic policy that strives for a 15% goal for total energy production from renewable sources by 2030. One of the largest, most pervasive barriers to renewable energy production is the ability of the big oil companies in Kuwait to influence the economy, positively and negatively, until other economic sectors are established and profitable.

=== Adaptations to climate change ===
Kuwait has taken many adaptation measures to protect the health and wellbeing of their citizens that include:

- Building desalination plants
  - Approximately 37% of Kuwaiti citizens depend on salt water from the Gulf as a result of dried up clean water sources. This dependence, according to domestic scientists, will increase as the average temperature rises, due to the drying up of clean water sources. In turn, Kuwait has begun to protect fresh water sources to maintain ecological stability and biodiversity. Since 2005, the government has supported the building of desalination plants as well as the distribution of water by encouraging companies to invest in water as well as innovate technology for producing clean water. Currently, water is being distributed in marketplaces, via pipelines and irrigation systems to farmers.
- Education on household desalination
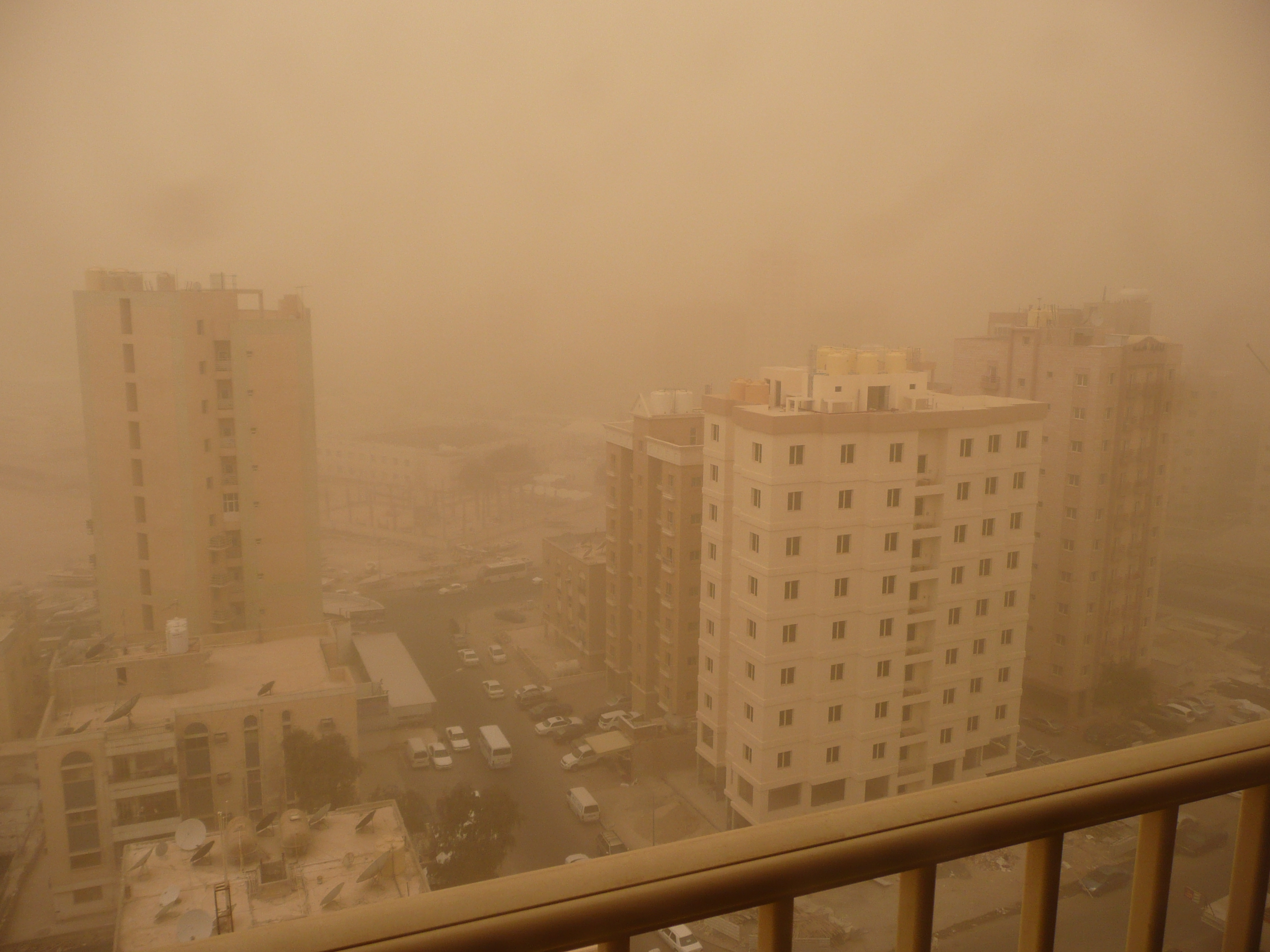
  - Sandstorm in Salmiya, Kuwait
    Kuwait, in partnership with the United Nations, has researched and developed processes for households to desalinate their water in a more cost efficient and immediate manner. This is extremely helpful to the populations in Kuwait who are too far from larger relatively urban centers or do not have the ability to construct infrastructure to maintain consistent fresh water access.
- Warning systems for sandstorms
  - Meteorologists sponsored by the United Nations in Kuwait correlate climate change to the increased frequency of storms. Significant damage to infrastructure and loss of life occurs when these dust storms gain strength or are unpredicted. Kuwait's rural populations, who experience these sandstorms more frequently and severely than the urban centers, do not often have the money or expertise to rebuild infrastructure. The Kuwaiti government has implemented warning systems, namely sirens, to allow for preparation for oncoming sandstorms.

== Air pollution ==
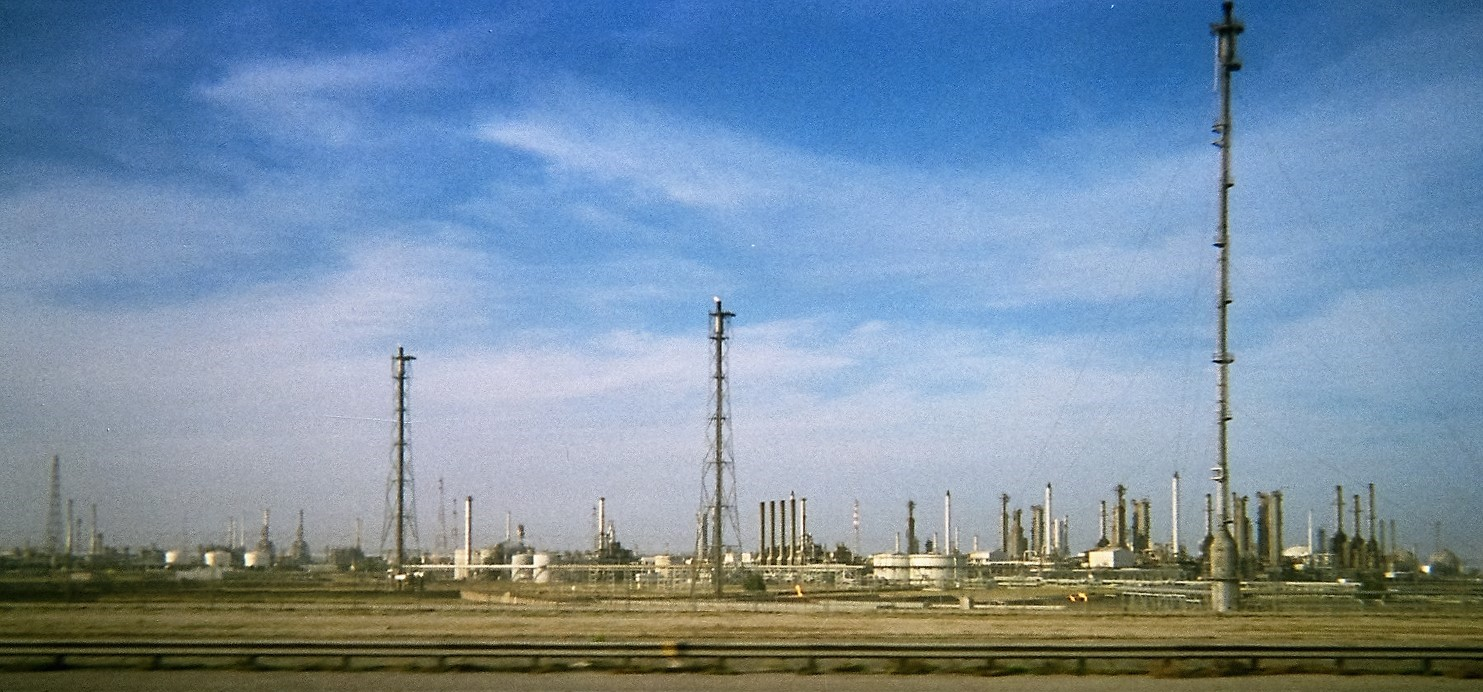
Oil field in Kuwait City, Kuwait

Kuwait's oil industry produces significant amounts of pollution from burning fossil fuels while drilling or fracking and in the process of exporting and storing oil. The country houses large oil wells that are always tapped and refilled. These oil wells are large portions of land that serve as fuel pools until the company is ready to use or export the stores.

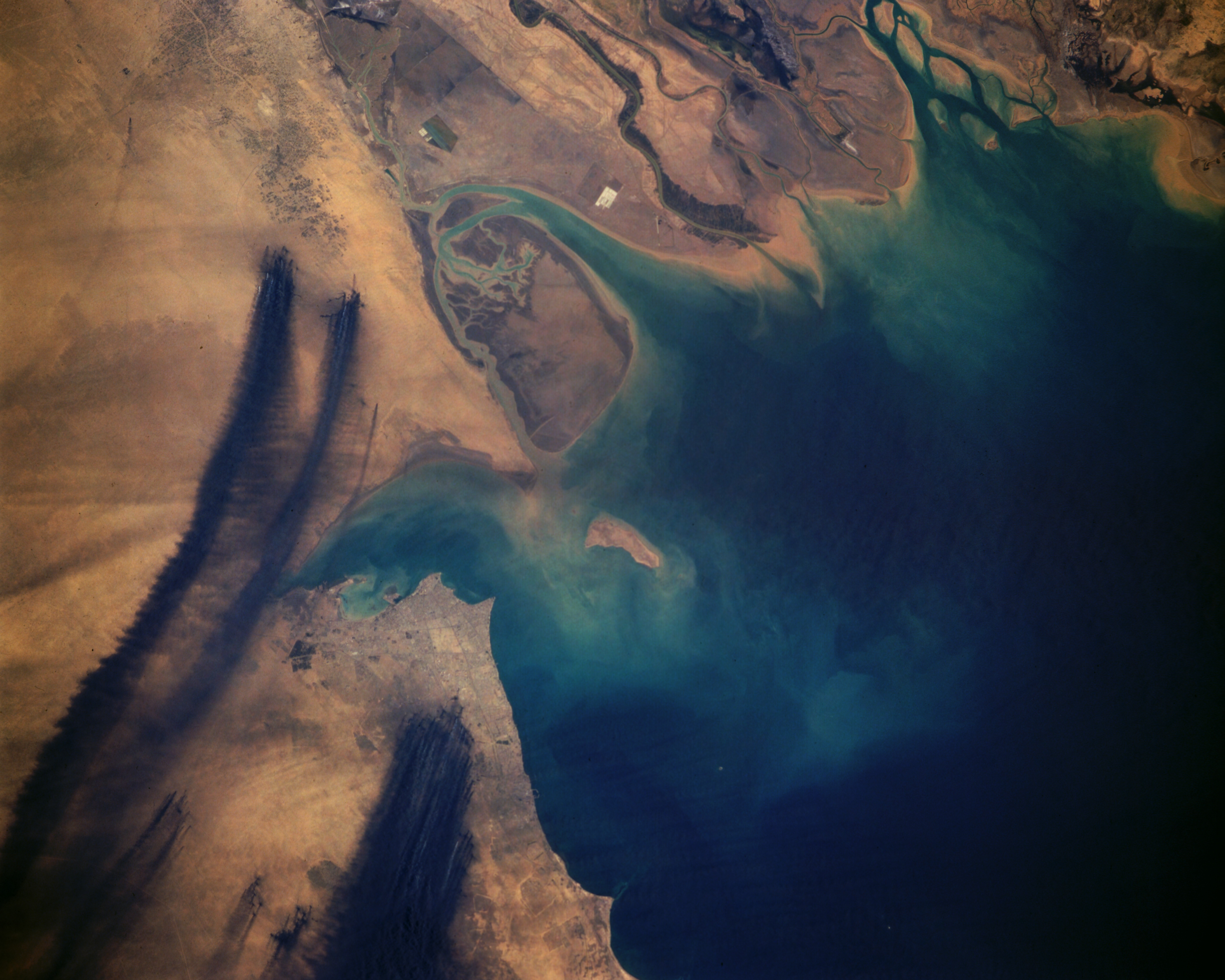
Smoke from burning Kuwait oil fields after Saddam Hussein set fire to during Gulf war.

United Nations researchers have not been able to accurately measure the amount of pollution that resulted from the oil fires; however, research indicates that have been irreparable damage to the climate as well as ozone due to the fires. The problems arising from the oil fires in coordination with continued air pollution as a result of oil production include:

- Damage to the health of Kuwaiti citizens
  - Pollutants released from the fires spread throughout Kuwait as well as the region, causing inhalation of ash leading to a significant rise in asthma, bronchitis and other illnesses leading to shortness of breath and death in some cases. This posed a systematic problem to country's economy since people spent more on healthcare as well as take time off from work. As air pollution continues, the Kuwait government has observed a rise in illnesses not only amongst those working in the oil industry but also especially around areas where oil is drilled or fracked and stored.
- Damage to the health of nonhumans

Many animals in the region, including birds, rodents, and snakes were killed by the fires, leading to the endangering or extinction of species. Domestic and international researchers are uncertain of the effect of air pollution on nonhumans but have concluded that increases in air pollution are causing disease and illness amongst animal and plant species around oil centers or who are being disrupted for the building of oil sites.

=== Air pollution adaptations ===
Kuwait has always been extremely dependent on oil production, perpetuating the problems that are associated with air pollution. While the country has worked towards generating more renewable energy sources, its oil abundance and a global dependence on oil have allowed for production to continue.

Kuwait has taken some measures to mitigate air pollution from oil production, such as stricter standards for pollutant emissions as well as the development of an emissions trade system with the industry's primary customers. There have been many other policy proposals including taxes on oil plants that emit greenhouse gasses above pre-2010 levels as well as subsidies for those plants that utilize green technology. These policies have both created awareness around minimizing air pollution despite the continued oil production as well as the preliminary steps for reducing greenhouse gas emissions.

On a global scale, Kuwait has blamed the West for the boom in air pollution in the 1990s in many conventions, environmental and political. While restitution was not given for the acts committed against Kuwait during the Gulf War, the country has taken more initiative towards reducing its air pollutants, chiefly greenhouse gas emissions. In recent years, Kuwait has reduced its emissions, indirectly reducing air pollution but remains one of the largest polluters in the world.

== Water pollution ==
Kuwait has experienced a water shortage that has been exacerbated by climate change. As a result, citizens and nonhumans are already dependent on desalination as well as scarce water resources. This makes the equilibrium for sustainable water delicate.

The Kuwaiti oil fires in addition to continued pollution from the oil industry not only threaten water quality but also have made some water sources unusable. When the fires occurred, the ash responsible for health problems settled in water sources, such as reservoirs, streams and freshwater storages for desalination plants. Also, much of the oil burned, released chemicals into the Earth that seeped into underground water aquifers. Humans and nonhumans depend on these sources, supported by aquifers, thus making pollution consequential to the health of many species. United Nations and domestic scientists believe that there is no significant way to clean the water sources or ensure that the water in these sources can be clean due to the highly diluted chemicals; however, education on how to test the water as well as resources for farmers to obtain fresh water has promoted clean water initiatives. While this does not help nonhuman species, reducing further water pollution can ensure species do not get as sick or endangered.

Kuwait's oil industry poses a large threat to the already valuable and poisonous water sources. Kuwait still stores millions of barrels of oil in oil wells that have leakages causing chemicals to seep into the Earth. These chemicals are always being pushed into the aquifers that are already slowly depreciating. Also, oil plants emit chemicals from burning that land in exposed water sources.

The Kuwait government along with the KOC, created the Kuwait Environmental Remediation Program in 2013 in order to clean the byproducts of the 1991 Gulf War and the 2003 Invasion of Iraq. This program has found some success in cleaning oil spills as they've already removed 1,650,000 landmines and plan to clear over ~114 square miles (300 km^{2}). The program is valued at over $3 billion.

On a global scale, there has been far more focus on climate change and emissions mitigation than the reduction of Earth and water pollution. Kuwait has not deviated from this agenda.

== See also ==
- Gulf War
- Kuwaiti oil fires
- List of environmental issues
- Climate Change
- Kuwaiti Oil Company
- United Nations Framework Convention on Climate Change
- Intergovernmental Panel on Climate Change
