= Climate change in Kuwait =

Changes in weather in Kuwait

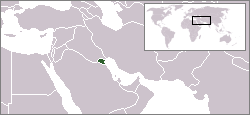
Location of Kuwait

Climate change poses a significant threat to Kuwait, a small country in West Asia with a total area of 17,818 km2. The country largely consists of arid desert environments and to a lesser extent, coastal areas and wetlands. Kuwait has some of the world's driest and warmest summers with average temperatures falling at around 46.2 degrees Celsius. Kuwait is highly vulnerable to climate change impacts, which pose many risks to the country's infrastructure, ecosystems, water resources and agricultural development. Kuwait has implemented several mitigation and adaptation strategies and is part of the NATO-Istanbul Cooperation Initiative (ICI) that looks to address climate risks and engage in sustainable solutions.

Kuwait has signed and ratified the Paris Agreement and updated its first Nationally Determined Contributions (NDCs) in 2021.

== Impacts on the natural environment ==
For more information see also Environmental issues in Kuwait

=== Greenhouse gas emissions ===
As with all countries globally, greenhouse gas emissions in Kuwait have increased rapidly since the 1990s. Kuwait is the 48th largest emitter of greenhouse gasses and the energy industry is the biggest emitter. From 1990 to 2021 emissions have increased by 4.3%. In terms of per capita, Kuwait produces 34.2 tons of CO_{2} per person and place 2nd out of 191 countries.

Majority of CO_{2} emissions in Kuwait come from electricity production (57%), followed by transport (18%), and oil and gas industries (11%). Its methane emissions come from solid waste disposal (64%) and wastewater treatment and discharge (18%). When all greenhouse gas emissions are calculated, emissions from the production of electricity and desalinated water related to the combustion of natural gas, and petroleum products have the highest percentage of contributions about 58 percent. While the government has proposed no oil production restrictions between 2020 and 2035, it has stated that it is working towards sustainable economic development through diversifying energy sources and technology.

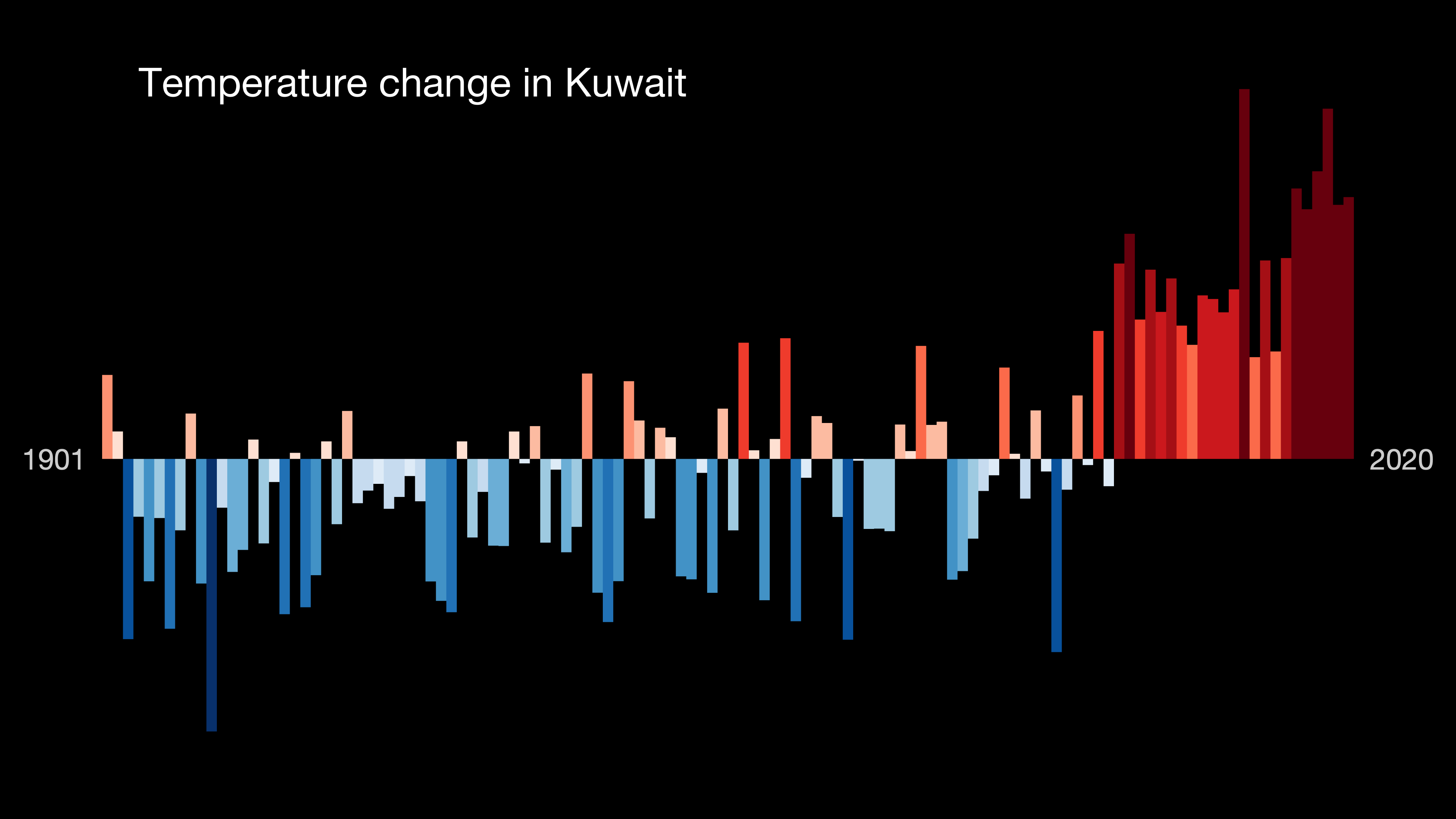
Temperature changes Kuwait, 1901-2020

=== Temperature changes ===
Climate Change is severely affecting Kuwait's average temperatures. There has been a sharp increase in higher-than-average temperatures during the summer months, reaching temperatures of 53 and 54 degrees Celsius, some of the highest in the world. Predictions indicate that these high temperatures are highly likely to occur more frequently and more intensely.

These over 50-degree days have been recorded for 64 days between 2010 and 2021 as compared to only 18 days over a 40-year time frame between the 1960s and 2000s. The last ten years have seen the greatest frequency and intensity of high temperatures. The Alahmad et al. 2020 study illustrates that certain populations are more vulnerable to intense temperatures than others. The study found that often non-Kuwaiti workers are exposed to higher heat due to taking on more demanding work.

Kuwait also suffers from numerous weather-related crises such as sand and dust storms and flash floods. Thus, it established Environmental Protection Law in 2014, and Article (118) states the needs to prepare emergency plans and crises and natural disasters management plan.

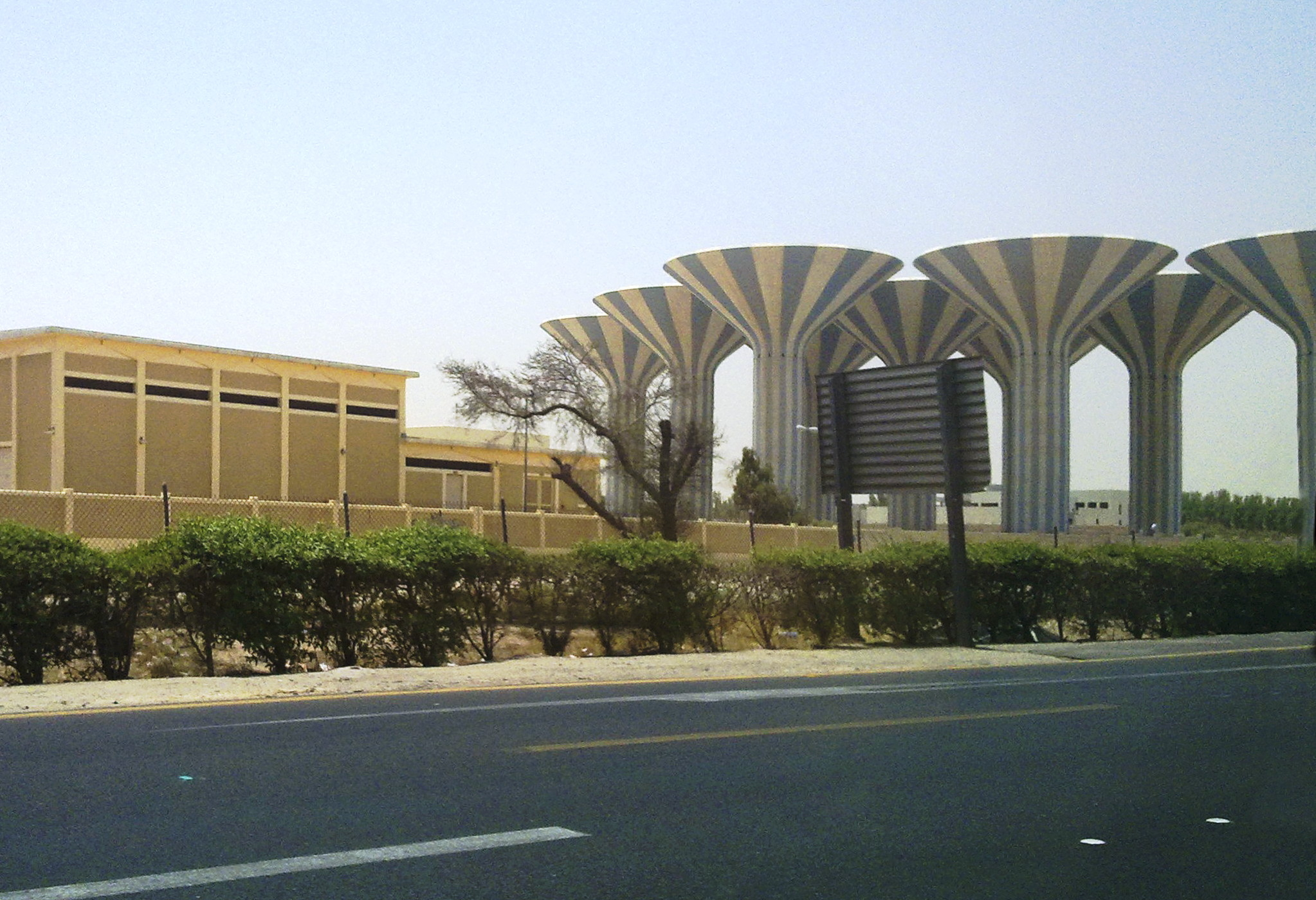
Kuwait Water Towers

=== Water resources ===
Kuwait is an incredibly arid climate and therefore, is already a water-scarce country. The majority of Kuwait's water falls between November and February. The changes in precipitation and increase in heat due to climate change puts the country in risk of desertification. Kuwait's water resources come primarily from desalinization of water and the recycling of wastewater. Desalinization of water produces 61% of the drinking and agriculture in Kuwait.

=== Ecosystems ===
Kuwait is home to a diversity of ecosystems including wetlands, deserts, and coastal areas that are all under threat due to climate change. In general, desert ecosystems are some of the most highly vulnerable and unpredictable landscapes to climate change and ecosystems. This is because shifts in temperature and precipitation can significantly affect the delicate ecosystem in place.

The Persian Gulf is a habitat for a various species that adapted to live in harsh environmental stresses in terms of warm and high saline condition. The Gulf has coral reefs and their associated fish and algal species, mangroves, and seabed grasses as the main ecosystems in this environment. The shallowness of water, the high salinity, and the extreme seasonal variations in water temperatures are considered to be the major stressors for coral reefs in the Persian Gulf.

Climate change's weather extremities are causing an increase in desertification and has contributed to a loss of biodiversity. As desertification increases and water quantity decreases, there are changes in soil quality, microbial organisms and the ecosystem becomes inhospitable for certain species. Already a country with very few vegetation covers, climate change is increasing land degradation and causing further vegetation loss. Fewer than 10% of perennials cover Kuwait.

== Impacts on people ==
See also Economy of Kuwait

=== Agriculture ===
Kuwait is a desert, water-scarce country with limited agricultural productivity to begin with. The main crops Kuwaiti farmers grow are fodder crops and some vegetables. The already limited bandwidth that Kuwait has in terms of farming and crop outputs is being further reduced due to climate change, pollution, and oil production. Substantial decreases in precipitation and worsening droughts, increased frequency and severity of dust storms and natural hazards, and sea level rise all pose threats to Kuwait's agriculture. The salinity of groundwater continues to increase due to climate change impacts, which is not conducive to soil management and agricultural productivity.

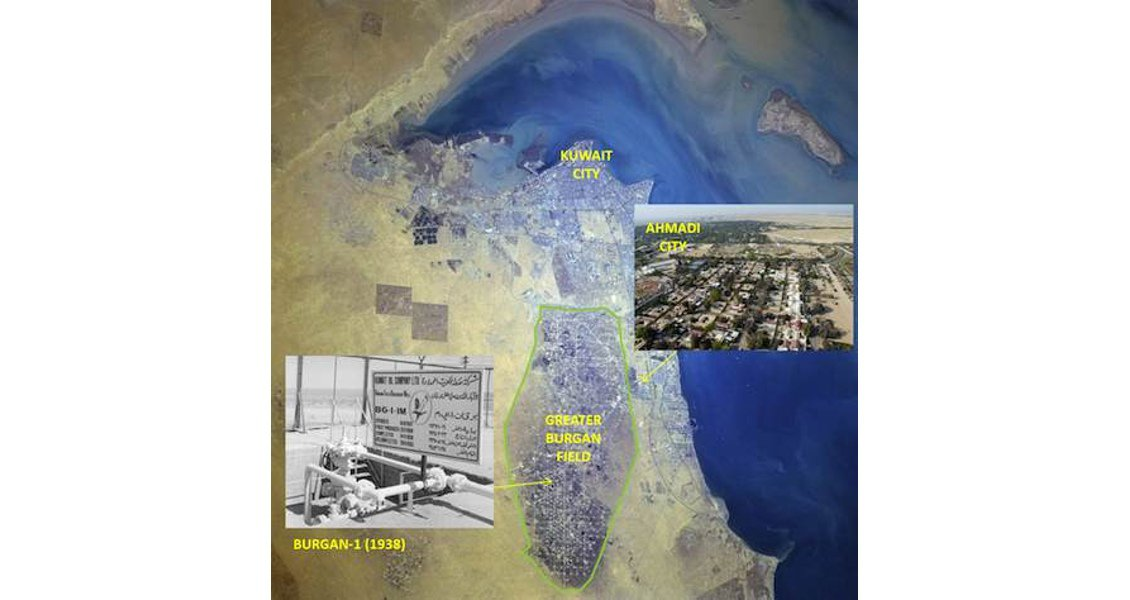
Burgan oil field, Kuwait

=== Oil ===
Oil is a major industry in Kuwait, making up 50% of its GDP, 94% of export revenues, and 90% of government income. Despite clear economic benefits to oil production, Kuwait is experiencing a host of negative environmental impacts, such as major air pollution, loss of animal species, contaminated soil, and water pollution. Kuwait put efforts into boosting its economy rather than addressing environmental concerns after the Oil Fires of 1991, which have led to permanent air and water pollution, animal extinctions, and human health issues. With a lack of technological, social, and political resources, climate change in Kuwait continues to worsen, and its dependency on oil drilling has only increased.

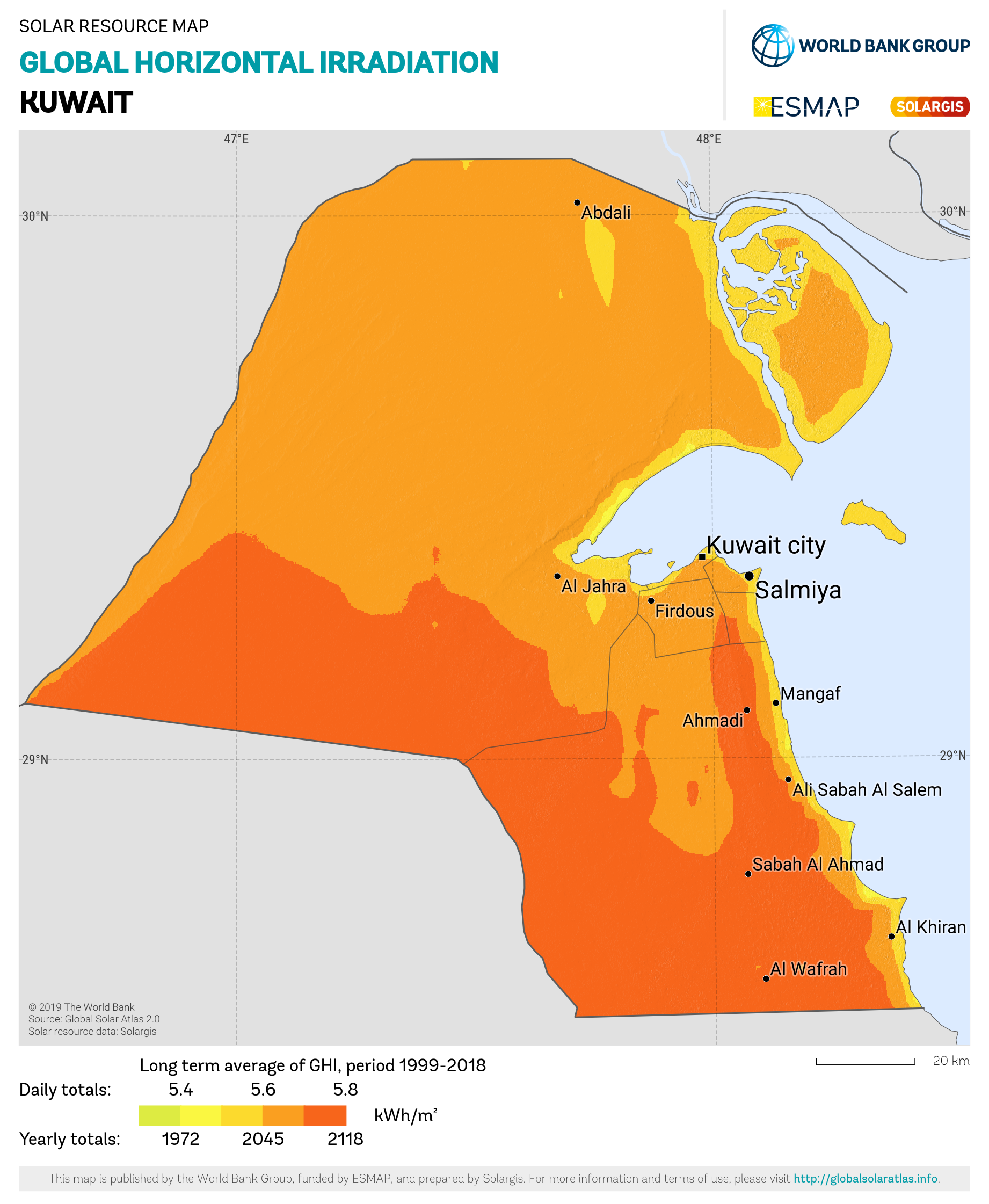
Solar resource map, Kuwait

=== Renewable energy ===
Based on its 2021 NDC update, Kuwait plans to reduce emissions by 7.4% by 2035. To do this, a number of laws were passed focused on emissions limitations. The Environmental Protection Act of 2014 was revised to protect natural resources, control pollution, and put a large emphasis on human health. The Environmental Protection Law promotes the use of energy-saving systems and develops new environmental strategies in the interest of increasing energy efficiency and decreasing consumption.

As of 2022, Kuwait's overall energy mix consisted primarily of oil (50.6%) and natural gas (49.3%) and a nominal fraction of wind, solar, and other renewables (0.1%). Although wind and solar power have become more popular globally, Kuwait's heavy economic reliance on oil companies impedes it from veering away from non-renewables and diversifying energy production. After the Paris Agreement, natural gas subsidies were put in place in hopes of reducing greenhouse gas emissions by 60% by 2020. Additionally, the Kuwaiti government passed legislation for a goal of 15% of total energy production to be from renewable sources by 2030.

To reach this goal, Kuwait constructed the Shagaya Renewable Energy Park 60 miles from Kuwait City in 2019. The power plant includes wind turbines and solar capacity, leveraging new research and developing energy innovations.

Based on the 2022 figures, however, Kuwait is not on track to meet its renewable energy goals.

=== Sea level rise ===
Warming temperatures due to climate change have caused sea levels to rise in coastal areas. Sea level rise has negative effects on both the environment and economy in Kuwait. Research shows that salinization of freshwater reduces plant growth and crop yields, increases soil salinity, and limits the growth of native plants. Studies suggest this leads to poor agricultural productivity, less fresh drinking water, ecosystem degradation, and biodiversity loss.

Kuwait witnessed rapid urbanization and population growth, primarily in its coastal zones. Flooding in coastal communities leads to infrastructure and housing damage, as well as saltwater intrusion, which threatens fish habitats and weakens the fishing industry. Potentially, the entire coastal zone could be affected by sea level rise. This could mean that 1% of the population may be forced to move to new areas, creating a housing loss that may cost 11.1 billion dollars by 2100.

=== Fisheries ===
Fisheries used to be a major economic industry for Kuwait before the oil companies were established. Currently, products from fisheries are still the second largest exports behind oil exports, consisting of two main sectors: the shrimp and artisanal multi-species fisheries and the multi-gear fisheries. Since 2013, however, Kuwait has seen a major decrease in fishery employment, declining from 3,500 reported employees in 2013 to 370 reported employees in 2015. Worsening environmental degradation and major water pollution in Kuwait since the rise of the oil industry explains these employment patterns.

=== Tourism ===
While tourism is not a major economic industry for Kuwait, the country has still seen rising numbers of visitors in the past 30 years. In 2019, the number of tourists coming to Kuwait was six times the number of tourists in 1995. While this increase has the potential to help the country economically and socially, the environmental impacts have been substantial. Due to infrastructure growth, increased commercial production, transportation, and accommodations for tourist activities, energy consumption in Kuwait increased by 80% from 1995 to 2019. This heightened energy demand has led to increased pollution, waste production, and greenhouse gas emissions, which Kuwait has been trying to curb since the early 2000s.

=== Health ===
There are major human health problems associated with pollution, which is a serious issue in Kuwait. Air pollution creates a lack of clean air, increases the spread of disease, and promotes lung issues. Extreme heat has major complications for those who are continually exposed to it, with 13.6% of deaths in Kuwait being heat-related. In 2019, a total of 33,472 people died from the extreme heat in Kuwait. This statistic is predicted to increase by over 15% if current climate patterns continue. Additionally, water pollution and salinization create a lack of clean water for drinking. Water scarcity and thirst often force people to consume contaminated water, which leads to illnesses and the rapid spread of diseases. Lastly, decreases in food production due to poor agriculture and a weakened fishing industry could lead to food insecurity in Kuwait.

=== Impacts on migration ===
There are a number of detrimental effects that climate change can and will have on the societal and economic structure of Kuwait. Studies suggest that human development and economic growth is likely to suffer as the living conditions and socioeconomic patterns in Kuwait worsen. Inequality and gaps in financial and social opportunities will continue to widen as resources become more and more scarce. Data indicates that political stability will likely suffer because of increased climate tensions; environmental issues, although they are typically not prioritized by governments in the Middle East, tend to exacerbate political and social tensions within and between countries due to resource scarcity and unequal distribution.

=== Housing ===
The impacts of climate change on citizens in Kuwait are worsening as the Earth continues to warm. These impacts include sea level rise, extreme heat, and resource scarcity. Sea level rise leads to widespread salinization and flooding in coastal areas, which is an issue for Kuwait, as it is situated on the coast of the Persian Gulf. In 2016, Kuwait recorded a high temperature of 53.9 °C (129 °F), putting people in danger of heat stroke and heat-related death, which disproportionally targets vulnerable communities. People have and will continue to experience damage to their homes and communities, less fresh drinking water from saltwater intrusion, and decreased food and water availability of climate impacts continue to worsen.

== Mitigation ==
The UN criticized Kuwait for having extremely high greenhouse gas emissions and for neglecting environmental issues. In 1995 and 2005, Kuwait signed the UNFCCC and the Kyoto Protocol, respectively. Despite showing concern for environmental issues, the country made no progress in terms of restoration or mitigation. Recently, however, Kuwait has taken domestic and international steps toward addressing climate change impacts. Kuwait created governing bodies to monitor industrial impacts on the environment, such as the Kuwait Environment Public Authority (EPA) for research, education, and policy addressing climate change. They submitted Intended Nationally Determined Contributions during the Paris Convention, stating plans to work towards sustainable economic development. These INDCs also include projects and policies centered on diversifying energy sources.

Despite these efforts, Kuwait is still struggling with major environmental issues that have led to human health concerns and problems for domestic wildlife. Additionally, they continue to faces struggles with social and political support for environmental protection.

== Adaptation ==
=== Desalinization ===
Because of the extensive salinization of freshwater from flooding and saltwater intrusion, Kuwait is forced to desalinize saltwater sources in order to provide enough water supplies for citizens. There is minimal rainfall throughout the year and no freshwater streams in the country, so desalinization is a necessity in Kuwait, even if climate change impacts are disregarded. Water demands are on the rise in Kuwait, so it is critical for the government to make desalinization a viable, sustainable, long-term practice. By decreasing the cost of desalinization and boosting water reuse infrastructure, Kuwait is taking steps toward the long-term implementation of desalinization and sustainable water resource management.

=== Sandstorm warnings ===
Partnered with the UN, Kuwaiti meteorologists developed a warning system to alert civilians of sand and dust storms (SDSs). The increased severity and frequency of these storms created an increased urgency for better storm preparation and rebuilding. People were losing their homes, infrastructure and urban areas were being destroyed, and recovery efforts were inadequate because of a lack of financial resources. Consequently, safety measures, such as sirens and announcements, were put in place to alert the community of incoming storms. Despite this system, Kuwaiti citizens still feel that safety measures are insufficient and do not improve preparedness. To enhance this warning system, it would be beneficial for Kuwait to implement better communication, education and trainings, and emergency planning in the current SDS warning system.

== Government Action ==
=== International cooperation ===
Kuwait has been actively involved with the NATO-Istanbul Cooperation Initiative (ICI) which has a regional center in Kuwait. The ICI was established in 2004 to foster relations and create a platform for cooperation on security issues in the Persian Gulf region. The initiative includes Bahrain, Kuwait, Qatar and the United Arab Emirates. January 30, 2023 marked the first time ICI met to discuss issues of climate challenges and cooperation tactics for addressing them.

The ICI met for the first time in Kuwait in March 2023 to address climate change initiatives, and followed up with a second conference on climate change and security in April 2024.

Additionally, in September 2023, Kuwait co-organized an event with the EU and International Labor Organization (ILO) titled "Supporting a Just Transition in Kuwait: Decent Jobs for Sustainable Future." The aim was to establish some efforts on climate change issues ahead of the COP28 conference held in 2023.

=== National policy ===
For more information see also Renewable Energy subsection.

Public discourses and protests surrounding climate change and climate activism in Kuwait have been relatively minimal. Kuwaiti freedom of expression is quite restricted, which limits the ability for public protests on climate change, despite Kuwait's role in per capita emissions and oil.

The Kuwaiti government has made several efforts and plans to address climate change. Kuwait signed the Paris Agreement in 2016 and then made changes to it in April 2018. Within the Kuwaiti Nationally Determined Contributions (NDCs), the government states that they will both continue to produce oil while agreeing that GHG emissions should be lowered.

Kuwait's main Environmental Law document adopted in 2014 has been the basis of much of its environmental commitments, including the NDC. The Environmental Law document focuses heavily on mitigating oil spills. In 2018, Kuwait established the Supreme Energy Committee (SEC). However, as of 2021, no plan to achieve energy development goals have been implemented, and no real progress has been made.

As an oil-based economy, transitioning to a greener state poses many challenges. In 2016, the Kuwaiti government decided to cut back in its fuel subsidies because of the enormous economic cost. Nordenson's report explains that while this decision could have been a positive green shift in GHG-emissions, the government received backlash from much of the public. Like many other countries in the Persian Gulf region dependent on oil production, Kuwait faces challenges of contradicting demands for its economy and the climate.

=== More information ===
See Environmental Issues in Kuwait.
