= Wafra oil field =

Oil field in Kuwait

Wafra Oil Field
- Country: Kuwait
- Region: Great Burgan
- Offshore/onshore: onshore
- Coordinates: 28°37′3″N 47°53′58″E
- Operator: Chevron Corporation

Field history
- Discovery: 1954
- Start of production: 1954

Production
- Current production of oil: 600,000 barrels per day (~3.0×10^{7} t/a)
- Estimated oil in place: 3505 million tonnes (~ 4.0×10^{9} m^{3} or 25000 million bbl)

The Wafra Oil Field is an oil field situated within Great Burgan. Discovered in 1984, it was developed by Kuwait Oil Company. The oil field is operated and owned by Chevron Corporation. The Wafra oil field's proven reserves are approximately 25 billion barrels (350×10^6 tonnes), with production averaging 600,000 barrels per day (95,000 m^{3}/d).

In 2009, steam injection commenced at the Large-Scale Steamflood Pilot Project targeting the carbonate First Eocene reservoir at the Wafra Field.

On 26 May 2025, Saudi Arabia and Kuwait have jointly announced a significant new oil discovery in the Partitioned Zone, a shared border area between the two nations. The find was made in the North Wafra Wara-Burgan field, approximately five kilometers north of the existing Wafra field. Crude oil flowed from the Wara reservoir in the North Wafra (Wara-Burgan-1) well at a rate exceeding 500 barrels per day, with an API gravity between 26 and 27 degrees. This marks the first discovery since the resumption of joint production operations in mid-2020. The discovery underscores the two countries' ongoing cooperation in energy exploration and development, reinforcing their roles as reliable global energy suppliers and enhancing their energy security and production capabilities.
