= South Magwa oil field =

Oil field in Kuwait

South Magwa Oil Field
- Country: Kuwait
- Region: Great Burgan
- Offshore/onshore: onshore
- Operator: Kuwait Oil Company

Field history
- Discovery: 1984
- Start of production: 1985

Production
- Current production of oil: 300,000 barrels per day (~1.5×10^{7} t/a)
- Estimated oil in place: 3505 million tonnes (~ 4.0×10^{9} m^{3} or 25000 million bbl)

The South Magwa Oil Field is a Kuwaiti oil field located in the Great Burgan. It was discovered in 1984 and developed by Kuwait Oil Company. The oil field is operated and owned by Kuwait Oil Company. The total proven reserves of the South Magwa oil field are around 25 billion barrels (3.5 billion tonnes), and production is centered on 300,000 barrels per day (48,000 m^{3}/d).
