= Al-Maqwa =

Important area in Kuwait

Coordinates: 29.153155°N 47.991479°E

Al-Maqwa (Arabic: المقوع) in Kuwait that part of the Great Burgan area. Great Burgan comprises the Burgan, Al-Maqwa, and Al-Ahmadi fields located south of Kuwait City. Kuwait International Airport is located there.
