= Great Burgan =

Oil field in Kuwait

Most of Kuwait's oil is located in the Great Burgan area (reserves of approximately 70 billion barrels), which is considered to be the world's second largest oil field. Great Burgan comprises the Burgan, Al-Maqwa, and Al-Ahmadi fields located south of Kuwait City, as well as the Wafra oil field. These three fields together pump 31' and 33' range crude into 14 tank farms.

The Burgan field is known to be pressurized by seawater intrusion. While this had been speculated upon for decades, definitive proof was made evident in the 1991-92 period when the Iraqi Army used demolition explosives to break open scores of wells and set them on fire. The wells kept producing oil until capped, demonstrating to the world that natural pressure was causing the oil to flow to the surface, and pressure in nearby Saudi Arabian fields declined until the Burgan wells were capped. If the wells were productive under artificial lift the fires would have self extinguished from lack of fresh oil when the pumps were shut off.

In 2006 and again in 2007 the national oil company of Kuwait has stated that Burgan is producing at its best possible rate. If true this demonstrates that Kuwait has reached peak production and can not increase its production in the future.

== See also ==
- Peak Oil
