= Kuwait Environmental Remediation Program =

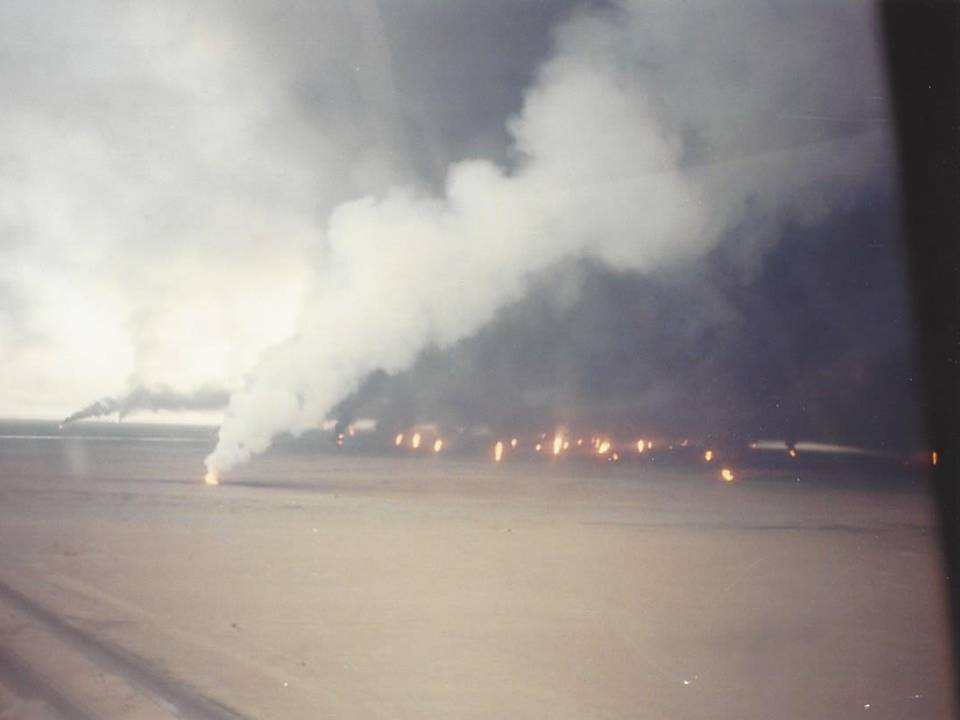
South Kuwaiti oil fires, 1991

The Kuwait Environmental Remediation Program (KERP) is a project funded by the UN that aims to clear swaths of contaminated soil in Kuwait. Their main objective is oil spills following the 1991 Gulf War. The goal of the program is to clear a swath of ~114 square miles (300 km^{2}). It is the largest inland environmental cleanup valued ~$3 Billion since the project's inception. A major motivating factor for this cleanup is the oil seeping deeper into the local groundwater.

After the oil contaminated soil is removed, stage two of the program will begin. Companies will begin revegetating formerly contaminated areas with vegetation

A secondary goal of the KERP is to remove UXO and other remnants of war following the Gulf War. During the Gulf War the retreating Iraqi Army left behind an estimated 2 million landmines. Following previous UXO removal programs and the KERP, an estimated 1.65 million mines have been removed. However an estimated 350,000 mines remain in the Kuwait desert.

During the 1991 Gulf War, the retreating Iraqi Army set fire to between 605 and 732 oil rigs on their way back to Iraq causing the Kuwaiti Oil Fires as a form of scorched earth warfare in an attempt to stop the coalition. During the 1991 and 2003 Iraq Wars there was lots of unexploded ordnance left in Kuwait. The KERP was created to solve the pollution and remnants of war left over from these conflicts.

== Companies Involved ==
The following companies have been approved by the KOC and have received contracts to work on their respective zones.

=== Management ===
Worley (Project Management Consultants)

=== North Kuwait ===
==== Zone 1 ====
Total value of the Zone 1 contract is $193.58 million.

- Lamor Company
- JV of Khaled Ali Al Kharafiand Brothers for Construction Contracting

==== Zone 2 ====
Total value of the Zone 2 contract is ~$188 million.

- Kuwait Company for Process Plant Construction & Contracting (KCPC)

=== South Kuwait ===
==== Zone 1 ====
Total value of the Zone 1 contract is $196.53 million.

- Lamor Company
- JV of Khaled Ali Al Kharafiand Brothers for Construction Contracting

==== Zone 2 ====
Total value of the Zone 2 contract is $185.2 million.

- JV of Heavy Engineering Industries and Shipbuilding Company (HEISCO)
- Hangzhou Zaopinst Co., Ltd

==== Zone 3 ====
Total value of Zone 3 contract is $250.6 million.

- Enshaat Al Sayer General Trading & Contracting Co.

=== Landmine Removal ===
- SafeLane Global

== Timeline ==
In May 2017 the project began to secure bids for the project management consultants.

In April 2018 Worley secured the bid to become the project management consultant for the project.

In December 2021 more contracts began to be secured, namely the South Kuwait zones.

In February 2023 the Re-vegetation contract began to be drafted.

In Late 2023 the KOC signed new contracts worth $1.7 billion expanding the program's funding and ability to effectively repair the environment and remove UXO.

In March 2024, the KOC extended Worley's role as the Project Management Consultants for an additional 5 years.

In April 2024, The companies Khalid Al Kharafi and Lamor Corporation cleaned 2.3 million tons of oil-polluted soil.

As of September 2024, the KOC is expanding the scope of the KERP and has begun the bid evaluation. They are planning on reorganizing the zones and contracts. There will be two contracts for three zones. These contracts will includes cleanup operations and re-vegetation of the zones with a goal to "plant 8 million shrubs, grasses, and trees."
