= Kuwait Oil Company =

Oil company based in Ahmadi, Kuwait

Kuwait oil company
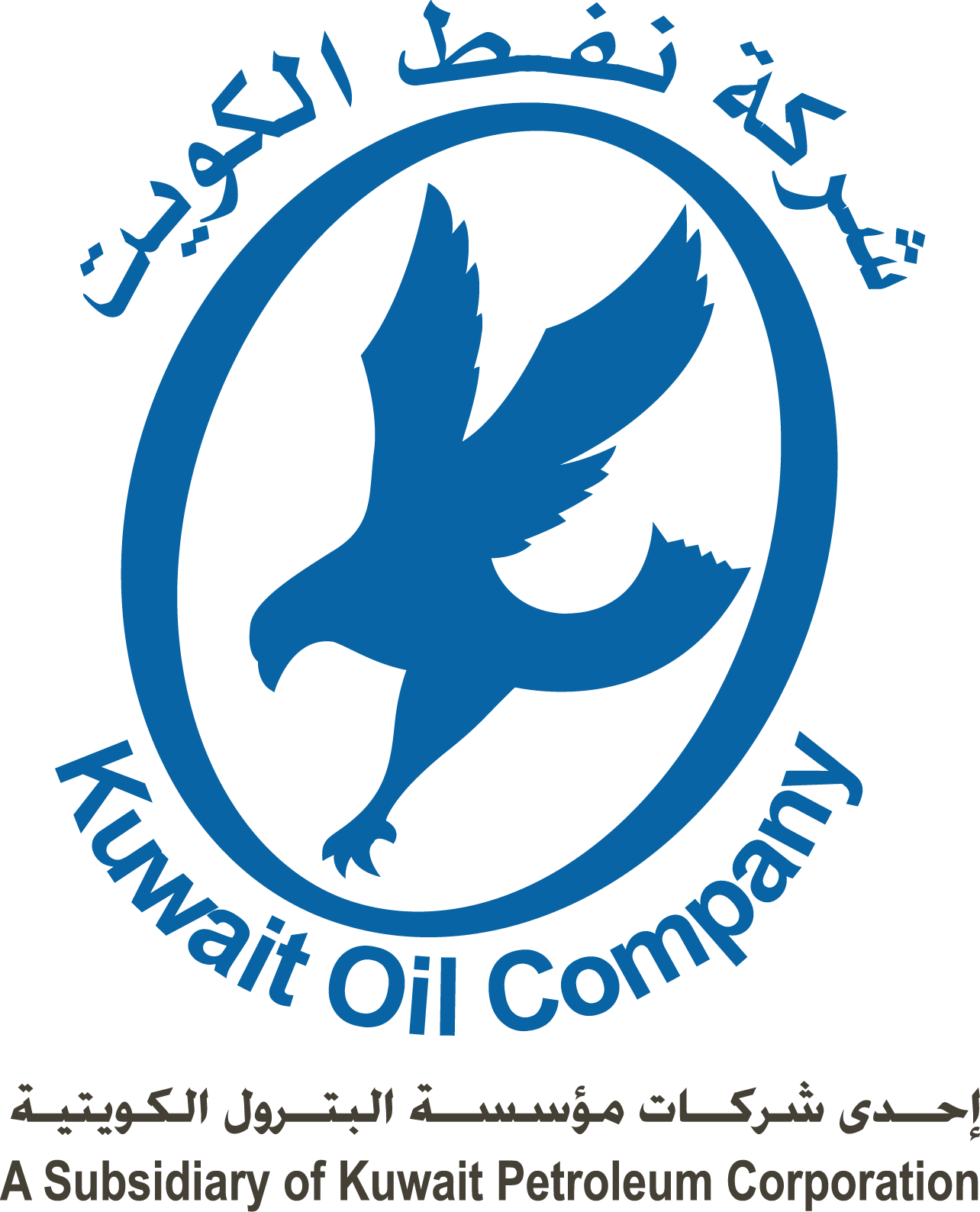
- Type: Subsidiary
- Industry: Oil and gas industry
- Founded: December 23, 1934; 91 years ago
- Founder: Anglo-Persian Oil Company; Gulf Oil
- Headquarters: Ahmadi, Kuwait
- Area served: Global
- Key people: Ahmad Jaber Al-Eidan (CEO)
- Products: Petroleum; Natural gas
- Net income: KWD 233.7 million (FY 2024/25); US$ 761 million
- Owner: Government of Kuwait
- Parent: Kuwait Petroleum Corporation
- Website: www.kockw.com

Kuwait Oil Company (KOC) is an oil company headquartered in Al Ahmadi, Kuwait. It is a subsidiary of the Kuwait Petroleum Corporation (KPC), a government-owned holding company.

As of 2024, Kuwait's oil production is approximately 2.4 million barrels per day (bpd), largely in line with its OPEC+ quota, while its sustainable production capacity is estimated at 2.9 million bpd. The country has a long-term strategic goal to increase its production capacity to 4 million bpd by 2040.

Kuwait nationalized its oil industry in 1975. KOC holds the sole rights to explore, produce, and develop oil and gas resources within the state of Kuwait. Kuwait's oil reserves are estimated to be around 101.5 billion barrels.

== History ==
The Kuwait Oil Company Limited was established on 23 December 1934 as a joint venture between the Anglo-Persian Oil Company (now BP) and the American Gulf Oil Company (now Chevron). The company began drilling operations in 1936.

Oil was first discovered in 1938 at the Burgan field, (Note: Burgan discovery well was drilled with a rotary rig and spudded in October 1937. Struck oil at a depth of 3,670ft in early March 1938.) which remains one of the largest oil fields in the world. Subsequent discoveries were made in Magwa (1951), Ahmadi (1952), Raudhatain (1955), Sabriya (1957), and Minagish (1959). The first commercial export of crude oil commenced in 1946.

During the Gulf War, as Iraqi forces withdrew from Kuwait in 1991, they set fire to over 700 Kuwaiti oil wells in an act of environmental sabotage. The fires burned for months, causing catastrophic environmental damage, until the last well was capped on 6 November 1991. To address the long-term consequences, KOC and the Kuwaiti government established the Kuwait Environmental Remediation Program (KERP) in 2013. In 2023, KOC signed contracts worth $1.73 billion to expand KERP's soil remediation efforts.

Wells completed (Note: 1947: 1948: 1949: 1950,1951: 1952,1953: 1954:)
Year	Oil	Gas	Dry	Feet
(Note: First well in Kuwait drilled at Bahrah and abandoned at 7,950ft)1937	0	0	1	
1947	5	0	0	23,818
1948	24	0	0	116,112
1949	49	0	0	246,773
1950	13	0	0	61,188
(Note: 2 wildcats (10,395ft): the Magwa discovery well and one dry hole)1951	20	0	1	89,985
1952	21	0	2	(Note: Footage estimated)98,555
1953	17	0	0	73,100
(Note: 1 dry wildcat at Umm Gudair (20 miles west of Burgan) abandoned at 8,071ft. Same rig was moved 99 miles in 40 hours and started drilling wildcat Raudhatain No. 1 (57 miles NNW of Ahmadi) which was still drilling at depth of 7,363ft at year's end)1954	12	0	1	56,638

Production by year, by field (x 1,000 barrels)
Year	Burgan Magwa Ahmadi	Raudhatain	Sabriyah	Gudair	Minagish	Bahrah
1946	5,931					
1947	16,225					
1948	46,547					
1949	89,930					
1950	125,722					
1951	204,910					
1952	273,433					
1953	314,592					
1954	347,319					
1955	398,494					
1956	399,871					
1957	416,045					
1958	509,720					
1959	504,855					
1960	559,100	35,200				
1961	553,926	41,900	1,400			
1962	620,000	47,200	2,100			
1963	647,700	48,700	3,500	5,600		
1964	682,200	53,700	14,100	4,200	20,600	
1965	693,200	56,900	17,000	4,900	19,900	
1966	716,800	61,400	22,600	4,900	24,800	
1967	723,800	59,900	22,600	4,900	25,500	
1968	759,700	71,200	26,900	4,900	23,400	
1969	777,600	77,200	29,700	33,500	20,600	1,400
1970	806,500	77,900	60,200	32,800	19,300	1,400
1971	858,700	81,600	71,200	34,200	20,700	1,400
1972	882,000	83,900	74,300	34,900	21,300	1,400
1973	809,200	76,400	67,900	32,800	19,300	1,400
1974	665,100	77,000	45,000	25,000	18,500	0
1975	530,400	78,500	25,000	19,000	18,000	0
1976	574,100	80,453	14,689	13,024	17,715	0
1977	533,860	70,644	14,825	12,637	18,028	0
1978	552,700	90,200	32,300	8,300	9,600	0
1979	618,130	128,369	40,918	14,357	7,419	0
1980	398,000	70,000	25,300	7,000	6,000	0

== Operations ==
KOC's operations are focused on the exploration, drilling, and production of oil and gas within Kuwait. The company manages the nation's key oilfields, including the supergiant Burgan field. KOC produces several grades of crude oil, including Kuwait Export Crude (KEC), Kuwait Super Light Crude (KSLC), and developing its heavy crude oil from the Lower Fars field.

=== Strategic Goals and Recent Projects ===
KOC is implementing a long-term strategy to significantly boost its production capacity and diversify its energy sources.

- Production Growth: The central goal is to raise oil production capacity to 4 million bpd by 2040. This involves enhancing oil recovery from mature fields and developing new reservoirs, including heavy oil and offshore resources.
- Offshore Exploration: In late 2023, KOC launched its first offshore drilling campaign in decades, deploying rigs in the Persian Gulf to explore for oil and gas reserves. This marks a strategic pivot to unlock new sources of production.
- Durra Gas Field: KOC is proceeding with plans to develop the Durra gas field, located in the neutral zone shared with Saudi Arabia. This project is critical for meeting Kuwait's growing domestic gas demand but is subject to regional geopolitical disputes.
- Renewable Energy: To diversify its energy mix, KOC is collaborating with the Ministry of Electricity and Water on large-scale renewable energy projects. In May 2024, they announced a plan for a 1-gigawatt solar energy project, seeking a global operator to build and manage the facility under a long-term power purchase agreement.

== See also ==
- Petroleum industry in Kuwait
