= Roads in Kuwait =

Roads in Kuwait are mostly paved. Roadways extend up to 6,500 km, of which 4,900 km is paved. As of 2000, there were about 552,400 passenger cars and 167,800 commercial vehicles. The maximum speed limit, observed on major roads like the 5th, 6th, and 7th ring roads, the maximum speed is 120 Km/h. While the maximum speed limit on the 2nd, 3rd, and 4th ring roads, the maximum speed is 80 Km/h, and the 1st ring road speed limit is 100 Km/h. There are speed cameras on all major roads, highways, ring roads and near traffic lights. The Kuwaiti government spends nearly 450 million USD for these cameras. All roads in Kuwait are toll-free.

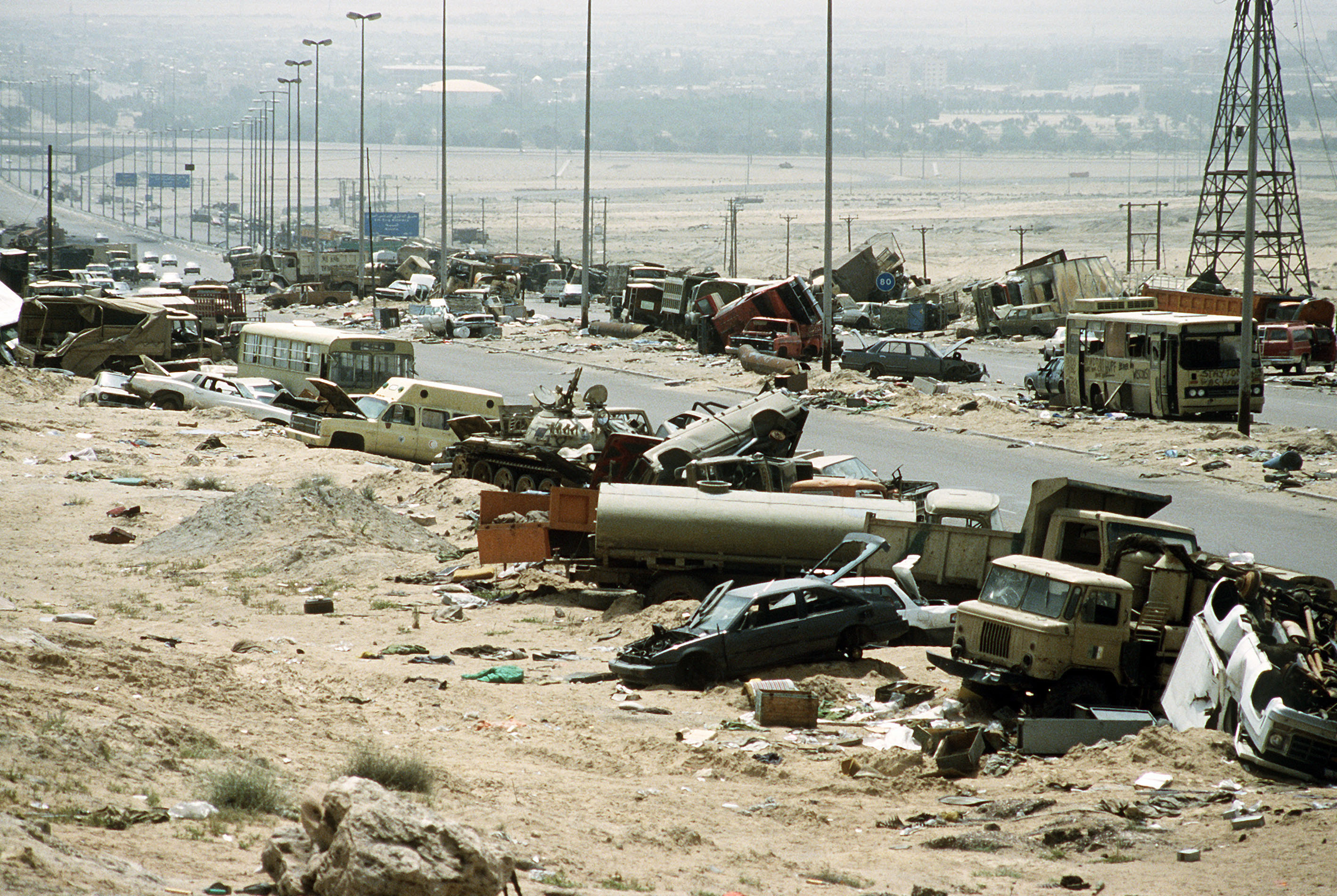
Highway of death, Kuwait - Iraq border (1991).

== Inter-Area Roads ==
Highways of Kuwait

Highway names

System links
- Transport in Kuwait

Kuwaiti highways are numbered, with most of the major horizontal/east-west highways being (called) ring roads and utilize a single-digit for their identification. Major vertical/north-south speedways use a multiplication of 10 for their numbers.

=== Ring Roads ===
Road	Image	Start	End	Length	Areas served	Landmarks	Speed Limit	Official name
❶ 1st Ring Road		Dasman, Kuwait City	Souq Al-Mubarakiya, Kuwait City	6.5 kilometres (4.0 mi)	Kuwait City (Sharq, Mirgāb, Jibla, Dasmān) Bneid Al-Gar, Dasma, Manṣūrīya, Dhāḥya, Shamiya	Dasman Palace; Shaheed Park; Souq Al-Mubarakiya		Ṣubāḥ I Road
❷ 2nd Ring Road		Bneid Al-Gar (@ Gulf Road)	Shuwaikh Residential (@ Gulf Road)	7 kilometres (4.3 mi)	North: Bneid Al-Gar, Dasma, Manṣūrīya, Dhāḥya, Shamiya, Shuwaikh South: Diʿīya, Qādsīya, Nizha, Faiḥāʾ, Kaifan	Ṣubāḥ Al-Sālim Stadium		Khalid Yūsif Al-Marzūg Road
❸ 3rd Ring Road		Green Island, Diʿīya	Shuwaikh Industrial	8 kilometres (5.0 mi)	North: Bneid Al-Gar, Diʿīya, Qādsīya, Nizha, Faiḥāʾ, Kaifan, Shuwaikh Industrial Area South: Shiʿib, Hawally, Rawda, Adailiya, Khaldiya, Shuwaikh Industrial Area	Green Island; The Public Authority for Applied Education and Training		ʿAbdallah ʿAli Al-Muṭawwaʿ Road
❹ 4th Ring Road		Salmiya	Shuwaikh Medical before Sulaibikhat(merges with Route 80)	16.6 kilometres (10.3 mi)	North: Salmiya, Maidan Hawalli, Hawally, Rawda, Adailiya, Khaldiya, Shuwaikh Industrial Area South: Salmiya, Jabriya, Surra, Cordoba, Yarmūk, Rai, Rigʿi, Andalus	Little Manila; The Avenues; Mubarak Al-Kabeer Hospital; College of Medicine at Kuwait University; Friday Market; Nurseries Market		Ḥusayn ʿAli Al-Rūmi Road
❺ 5th Ring Road		Bidiʿ Roundabout (between Salmiya and Rumaithiya)	Qairawan before Jahra	30.3 kilometres (18.8 mi)	North: Salmiya, Jabriya, Surra, Cordoba, Yarmūk, Rai, Rigʿi, Andalus, Nahdha, Sulaibikhat, Qairawan South: Rumaithiya, Bayan, Salam, Siddeeq, Khaitan, Omariya (Kuwait), Rabya, Ardhiya, Firdos, Sulaibiya,	Boulevard; Bayan Palace; The Avenues; Kuwait Zoo; Sulaibikhat Graveyard		Zayid bin Sulṭān Al-Nhayyān Road
❻ 6th Ring Road		At Taʿāwun Street between Salwa & Messila	Jahra	51 kilometres (32 mi)	North: South:	Kuwait University - Shaddādīya; Kuwait International Airport; Murouj; Jaber Al-Ahmad International Stadium; 360 Mall		Jasim Al-Khrāfi Road
6.5 Ring Road					Dhajeej, Jileeb, and Abdallah Al-Mubarak	Kuwait University - Shaddādīya; Kuwait International Airport		N/A
❼ 7th Ring Road		Between the boundaries of Mubarak Al-Kabir Governorate & Ahmadi Governorate	Sulaibya (merges with 6th Ring Road)	34 kilometres (21 mi)		Many industrial and agricultural areas		Sultan Qaboos Road

=== Gulf Road ===
Route 25, comprising Gulf Street, Blājāt Street, and Taʿāwun (Coöperation) Street, is a prominent coastal road that starts in Kuwait City and goes through Kuwait's southern coast passing by major attractions and landmarks of the capital until it reaches the boundary between Hawalli and Mubarak Al-Kabīr governorates at the 6th Ring Road. (Speed Limit 80Km/h)

=== Other highways ===
- Highways 30 and 40 (also called King Abdulaziz road and King Fahd road respectively): These run parallel to each other. They serve Mahboula, Ahmadi and Fintas. This system has been installed (also called Jassem Al-Kharafi road): The road helps the system was put into (also called Zayed bin Sultan Al Nahyan road): residents of the towns to go to Kuwait City. Later, the road joins and heads towards Saudi Arabia. It is used to get to Bahrain.

There are other highways which intersect the ring roads like Highway 50, 55, 60, 70 (Salmi road) residents of the towns to go to Kuwait City and Salmiya, 80 (Highway of Death), 85 and 801. Highway 51 (also called subhan al_maqwa road) It connects King Faisal Road 50 and the Sixth Ring Road to the Seventh Ring Road. Highway 35 (also called cairo street) he begins from kuwait city and ends in Baghdad roundabout in salmiya .Many ring roads are connected to highways.

== See also ==
- Transport in Kuwait
