= Kuwait's Second Constituency =

Constituency in Kuwait

Constituency Two
- Multi-member constituency for the National Assembly of Kuwait
- Electorate: 90,478

Current constituency
- Created: 2008
- Seats: 10

The second constituency of Kuwait is a legislative constituency in Kuwait. Like the other four constituencies in Kuwait, it elects exactly 10 members to the National Assembly via plurality vote. As of 2022, it currently represents eighteen residential areas and has an electorate of 90,478 (the smallest). The Hawalli and Capital governates are divided between the first, second and third constituencies. The former Speaker of National Assembly, Marzouq Al Ghanim is a member of this district.

== Areas in Constituency Two ==
There are a total of 90478 voters (46135 female voters; 44343 male voters).

- Murqab
- Abdullah Al-Salem
- Jibla
- Shuwaikh
- Shamiya
- Qadsiya
- Mansouriya
- Faiha
- Nuzha
- Sulaibikhat
- Doha
- Granada
- Qairawan
- Shuwaikh Industrial Area
- Shuwaikh Health District
- Nahdha
- North West Sulaibikhat
- Jaber Al-Ahmad City

== See also ==
- Constituencies of the National Assembly of Kuwait
- Demographics of Kuwait
