= Kuwait's Third Constituency =

Constituency in Kuwait

Constituency Three
- Multi-member constituency for the National Assembly of Kuwait
- Electorate: 138,364

Current constituency
- Created: 2008
- Seats: 10

The third constituency of Kuwait is a legislative constituency in Kuwait. Like the other four constituencies in Kuwait, it elects exactly 10 members to the National Assembly via plurality vote. As of 2022, it currently represents fifteen residential areas and has an electorate of 138,364. The Hawalli and Capital governates are divided between the first, second and third constituencies.

== Areas in Constituency Three ==
There are a total of 138364 voters (71882 female voters; 66482 male voters).

- Kaifan
- Rawda
- Adailiya
- Jabriya
- Surra
- Khaldiya
- Qurtuba
- Yarmouk
- Khaitan
- Salam
- Siddiq
- Hittin
- Shuhada
- Zahra

== See also ==
- Constituencies of the National Assembly of Kuwait
- Demographics of Kuwait
