= Abdullah Al-Salem =

Abdullah Al-Salem عبد الله السالم
- District
- Location within Kuwait
- Coordinates: 29.3525°N 47.9822°E
- Country: Kuwait
- Governorate: Capital Governorate
- Elevation: 16 m (52 ft)

Population (2011)
  - Total: 13,098

Abdulla Al-Salem (Arabic: عبد الله السالم) is an area of Kuwait City. It is known to be one of the areas where the wealthiest of the families of Kuwait live alongside Faiha, Shuwaikh,Kaifan, Khaldiya, Adailiya, and Shamiyah. Lands in this area range from 750 to 1250 square metres and as of the early 2000s, the average worth of a 1,000 square metre piece of land is between 1 and 2 million Kuwaiti dinars (about 3.3 to 6.6 million US dollars).

== Demographics ==
According to the Public Authority for Civil Information there are 22,429 residents. 51.44% are Kuwaiti, 42.65% Asians, 4.45% other Arabs, 1.16% Africans, 0.20% North Americans, and 0.09% Europeans.

== Location ==
Abdulla Al-Salem is located in a strategic area between the first and second ring roads. It is adjacent to Kuwait City. A drive to the city would be 5-10 minutes. Abdulla Al-Salem is located east of Shamiyah and west of Mansouriah.

== Blocks ==
The area is divided into four blocks. Block 1, the largest by area, is located to the north. Block 2, 3, and 4 are located to the south of block one and are situated from west to east in the order of Block 4, Block 3, Block 2.
