= Co-Op Society =

Kuwaiti cooperative societies

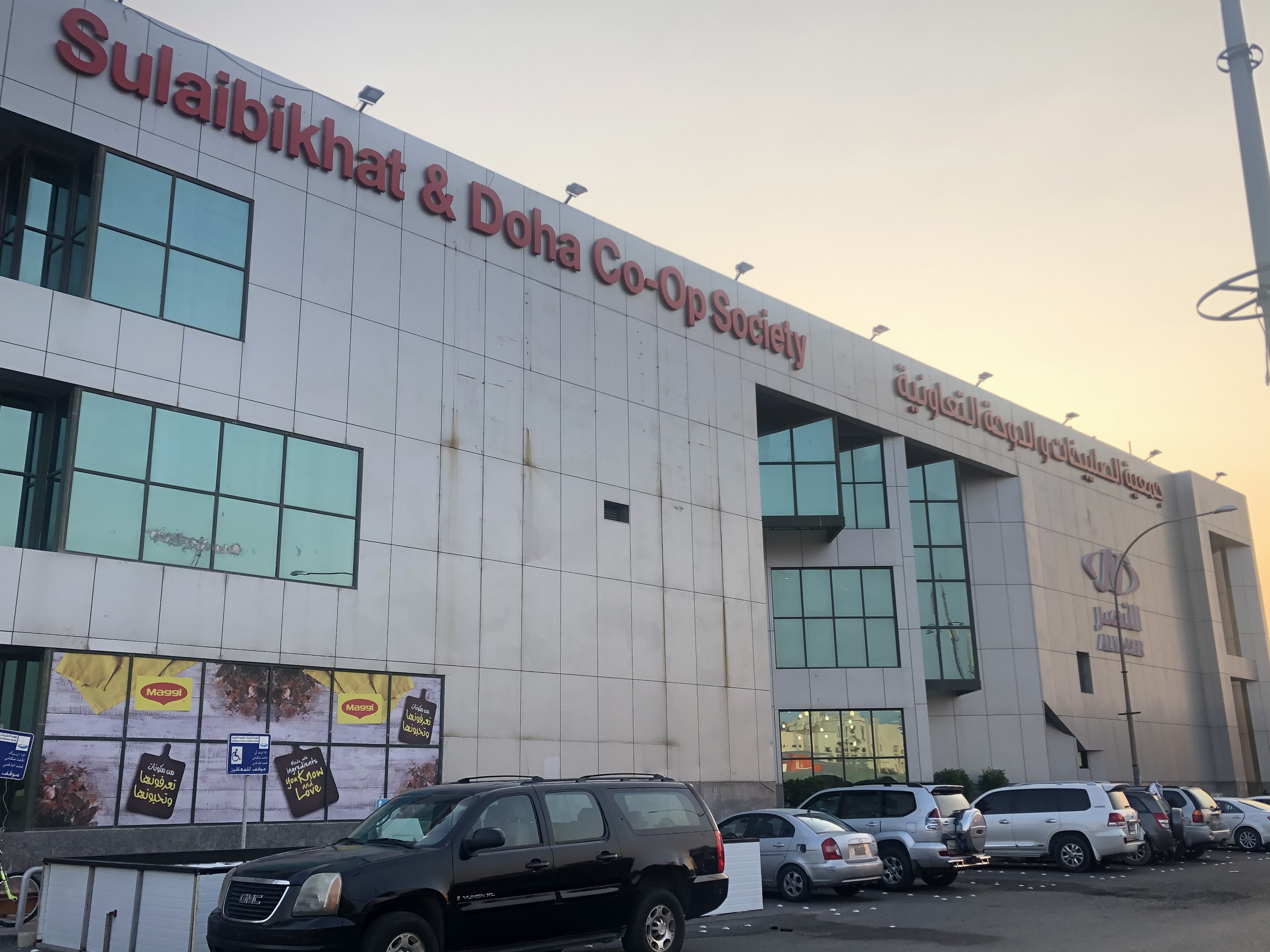
A Co-Op Society in Sulaibikhat, Kuwait

Co-Op Societies (Arabic: جمعية تعاونية jamʕīya taʕāwunīya), often shortened to Co-Op, refer to Kuwaiti public organizations that are set up in each area of Kuwait and to provide services to its residents. These services mainly manifest in setting up grocery and convenience stores in each area; Co-Op societies also often include a variety of different stores, both operated by the Co-Op and rented to private entities. There are around 60 Co-Ops in operation, making up around 60–70% of retail trade in Kuwait.

The residents of each area elect the board of their Co-Op on a yearly basis. Citizens in each area can become contributing members with voting power and receive a percentage of their purchases back annually.

== History ==
Comprising 70% of the retail trade in Kuwait, the legal basis for consumer cooperatives was established in 1962 with law No. 20. By the start of the 1980s, Kuwait's cooperative movement became open to Arab and international cooperative movements, and the Kuwaiti Union for Cooperative Societies sought membership in the International Cooperative Alliance as of March 1981. All the cooperative society come under the Union of Consumer Cooperative Societies.

=== Invasion of Kuwait ===
During the Iraqi invasion in 1990, Co-Ops played a major role in providing food and medicine, as well as support for residents and resistance groups. One of the aims of the Kuwaiti Resistance's guerilla tactics was to push the invading forces into their encampments to prevent them from coming near the co-ops, as they were seen as important and central community centres in each area. In addition to the negative psychological impact their visits would cause, Iraqi officers would at times harass Kuwaiti citizens and residents there and steal items; the Kuwaiti resistance followed a safe approach in response to such incidents by using remote detonations and silenced weapons.

== Issues ==
=== Corruption ===
Some Co-Ops face issues of corruption, negligence, and/or mishandling. The grocery department of Dasma and Bnēd il-Gār Co-Op, for example, was replaced by a private grocery store following litigation and corruption allegations. The government dissolved the boards of Jābrīya Co-Op and Fahad il-Aḥmad Co-Op over "grave financial and administrative errors", though in Jabriya's case, the board was reinstated following a court order.

=== Privatization ===
There have been some attempts to privatize some of the Co-Ops. However, the response to such a move has generally been critical.

== Gallery ==
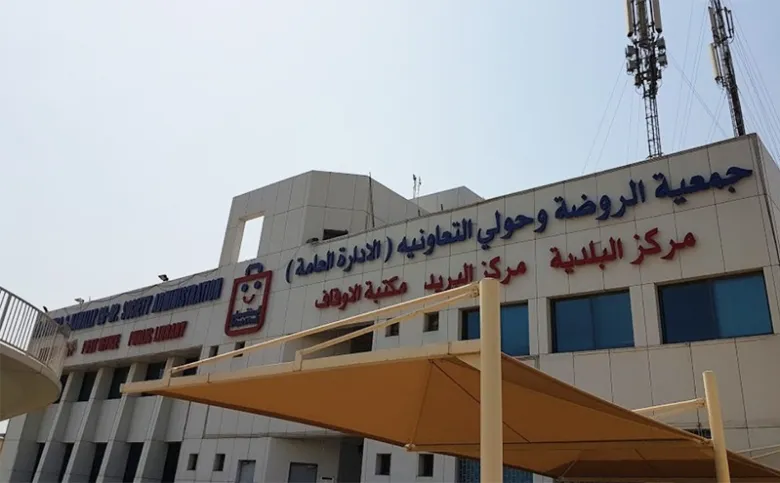
Hawally and Rawda Co-Op main centre in Rawda, Kuwait
