= Dasma =

Area of Kuwait

Dasma Dasma
- Area
- Location within Kuwait
- Coordinates: 29°21′56″N 48°0′3″E
- Country: Kuwait
- Governorate: Capital Governorate

Population (2011)
  - Total: 12,455

Dasma (Arabic: الدسمة) is one of the areas of the Capital Governorate in Kuwait City, Kuwait. Its name, literally translated to 'Rich', is in reference to its rich soil and numerous historical wells.

Dasma is surrounded by Bneid Al-Gar from the East, Mirgab from north, Mansouria from the West and Da'iya from the South.
