= Road signs in Kuwait =

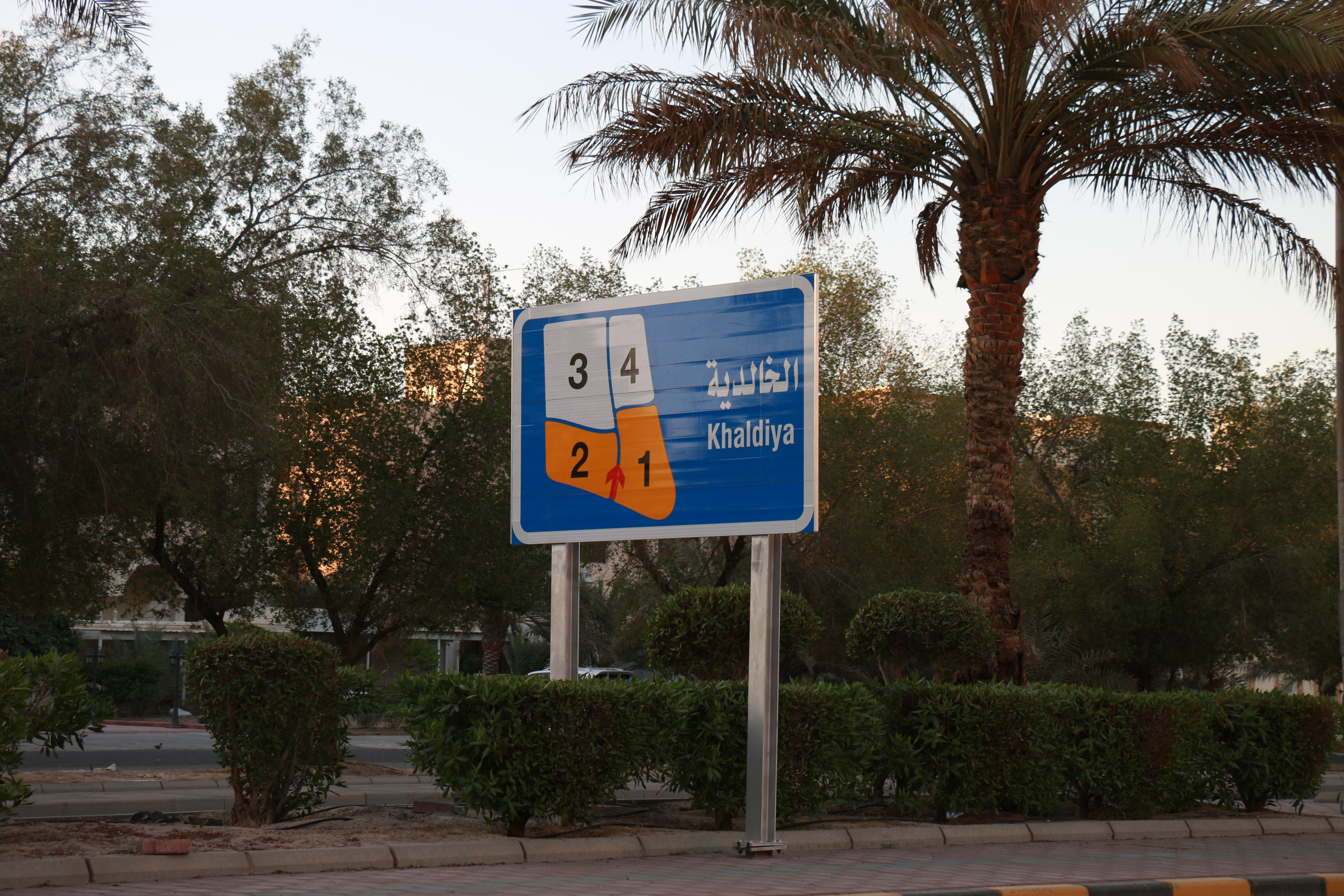
Road sign at an entrance to the area of Khaldiya, Kuwait City

Road signs in Kuwait are regulated under the 2011 Kuwait Manual on Traffic Control Devices. They closely follow those used in the United Kingdom with certain distinctions, with text written in Arabic and English.

== Regulatory signs ==
=== Priority signs ===
Stop

Give way

Give way sign ahead

Give way to trains

Go

Give way to oncoming traffic

Priority over oncoming traffic

=== Mandatory signs ===
Turn left

Turn right

Go straight

Turn left ahead

Turn right ahead

Go straight or turn left

Go straight or turn right

Turn left or right

Pass onto right

Pass either side

Roundabout

Bicycles only

Minimum speed limit

End of minimum speed limit

=== Prohibitory signs ===
No left turn

No U-turn

No entry

Except buses

No motor vehicles

No buses

Truck weight limit

Weight limit

Axle load limit

Width limit

Length limit

Height limit

No overtaking

No overtaking by trucks

No pedestrians

No bicycles

No parking

No honking

Customs

Speed limit

No learner drivers

No animals

No trucks from centrain lanes

No stopping

== Warning signs ==
Crossroads

Road from the left

Road from the right

T-junction on left

T-junction on right

Staggered crossroads, first to the left

Staggered crossroads, first to the right

Distance

Left merging traffic

Right merging traffic

Roundabout

Slow

Curve to the left

Curve to the right

Double curve, first to the left

Double curve, first to the right

Road narrows

Road narrows on left side

Road narrows on right side

End of dual carriageway

Two-way traffic

Height restriction ahead

Overhead cables

Maximum height

Level crossing with barriers ahead

Level crossing without barriers ahead

Single-track level crossing

Multi-track level crossing

Children

School

Playground

Traffic light

Signals out of order

Pedestrian crossing

Camels crossing

Hump Bridge

Opening bridge

Tunnel

Quayside or riverbank

Uneven road

Distance

Slippery road

Low-flying aircraft

Other dangers

Accident

Bump

Roadworks

Loose gravel

== Information signs ==
Parking

Buses

Trucks

Pedestrian crossing

Subway

Emergency telephone

Police station

Hospital

Hotel or motel

Camping

First aid

Hospital (inscription)

Taxis only

No through road (inscription)

Distance countdown marker (300m)

Distance countdown marker (250m)

Distance countdown marker (100m)

U-turn permitted

Lane direction

No through road

Exit ahead to the right

Advisory speed limit

Motorway

End of motorway

Bus and bicycle lane

== Route shields ==
State road shield
