= Meshary Al-Arada =

Kuwaiti singer and composer

- مشاري العرادة
- Born: August 17, 1982; Kuwait
- Died: January 7, 2018 (aged 35); Saudi Arabia
- Occupations: Singer, composer
- Notable work: “Farshi al-Turab” “Ummi Filastin” “Ya Rajae” “Tafakkartu Yawman”

Meshary Al-Arada (Arabic: مشاري العرادة) (17 August 1982 − 7 January 2018) was a Kuwaiti munshid (nasheed singer) and composer.

== Early life ==
Al-Arada was born in Kuwait on 17 August 1982 and grew up in the Yarmouk district of Kuwait City. He attended Al-Asma'i Secondary School in Qurtuba and graduated from Kuwait University's College of Arts, where he studied philosophy and minored in Islamic studies. He also spent a year studying at the University of Sharjah.

== Career ==
He started singing in childhood and was the first album in which he participated in 1995, then continued to participate in festivals in Kuwait and recording a set of single recordings, to participate in the first album in 1999 entitled The "innovators" with a group of singers, and then continued to participate in various festivals in Kuwait and abroad, such as the United Arab Emirates, Saudi Arabia, United Kingdom, Indonesia and Australia.

== Videography ==
- 2004: "Farshi al-Turab" فرشي التراب
- 2005: "Ramadan" رمضان
- 2006: "Zeman awal" زمان أول
- 2009: "Tesawar" تصوّر
- 2010: "Ala alehsan" على الإحسان
- 2011: "Khair yajmaona" خير يجمعنا

== Death ==
On 7 January 2018 he died in a car accident in Saudi Arabia.

== See also ==
- Mishary Rashid Alafasy
