= List of regions of Kuwait by Human Development Index =

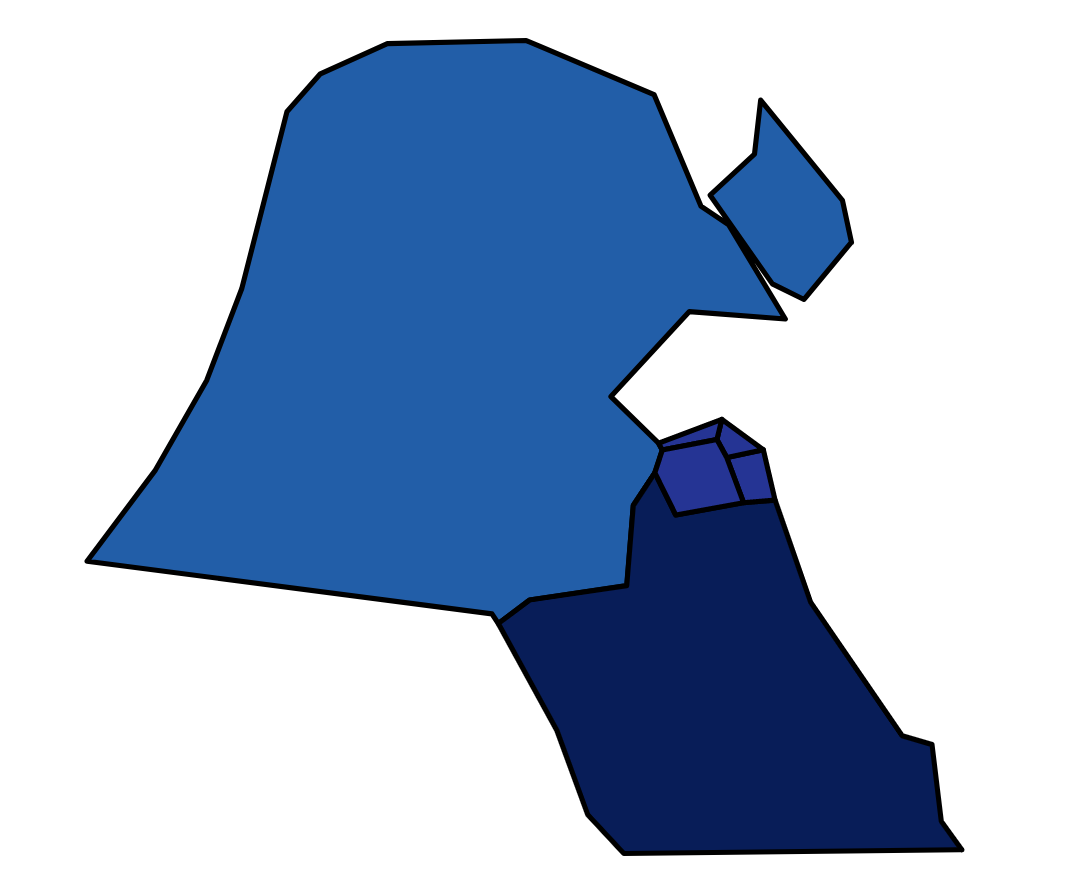
.815.805.796

This is a list of regions of Kuwait by Human Development Index as of 2024 with data for the year 2024.

Rank	Region (Governorate)	HDI (2023)
Very high human development
1	Ahmadi	0.861
–	Kuwait (average)	0.852
2	Al Asimah, Hawalli, Al Farwaniyah, Mubarak al Kabeer	0.850
3	Al-Jahra	0.841
