= Riggae =

Al-Riggae الرقعي
- Area
- Location of A-l Riggae in Kuwait
- Coordinates: 29°18′10″N 47°55′0″E
- Country: Kuwait
- Governorate: Farwaniya

Area
  - Urban: 2.39 km^{2} (0.92 sq mi)

Population (2020)
  - Area: 35,984
- Time zone: UTC+3 (AST)

Al-Riggae (Arabic: الرقعي) is an area of the Farwaniya Governorate, Kuwait, located in the southwest of the centre of Kuwait City. The Al-Riggae area is distinguished by its location between the Fourth and Fifth Ring Road (its four borders between Andalus, Al-Rai, Ardiya and Shuwaikh). It includes the Courts Complex, the Public Authority for Youth and Sports, and The Avenues Mall, one of the largest malls in Kuwait. The region is divided into the old and the new Al-Riggae.
