= ISO 3166-2:KW =

Entry for Kuwait in ISO 3166-2

ISO 3166-2:KW is the entry for Kuwait in ISO 3166-2, part of the ISO 3166 standard published by the International Organization for Standardization (ISO), which defines codes for the names of the principal subdivisions (e.g., provinces or states) of all countries coded in ISO 3166-1.

Currently for Kuwait, ISO 3166-2 codes are defined for six governorates.

Each code consists of two parts separated by a hyphen. The first part is KW, the ISO 3166-1 alpha-2 code of Kuwait. The second part is two letters.

== Current codes ==
Subdivision names are listed as in the ISO 3166-2 standard published by the ISO 3166 Maintenance Agency (ISO 3166/MA).

Click on the button in the header to sort each column.

Code	Subdivision name (ar) (BGN/PCGN 1956)	Local variant	Subdivision name (ar) (Note: For reference only, Arabic name in Arabic script not included in the ISO 3166-2 standard.)	Subdivision name (en) (Note: For reference only, English name not included in the ISO 3166-2 standard.)
KW-AH	Al Aḩmadī		الأحمدي	Ahmadi
KW-FA	Al Farwānīyah		الفروانية	Farwaniya
KW-JA	Al Jahrā’		الجهراء	Jahra
KW-KU	Al ‘Āşimah	Al Kuwayt	العاصمة	Capital
KW-HA	Ḩawallī		حولي	Hawalli
KW-MU	Mubārak al Kabīr		مبارك الكبير	Mubarak Al-Kabeer

== Changes ==
The following changes to the entry have been announced in newsletters by the ISO 3166/MA since the first publication of ISO 3166-2 in 1998:

Edition/Newsletter	Date issued	Description of change in newsletter	Code/Subdivision change
ISO 3166-2:2007	2007-12-13	Second edition of ISO 3166-2 (this change was not announced in a newsletter)	Subdivisions added: KW-MU Mubārak al Kabīr
Newsletter II-3	2011-12-13 (corrected 2011-12-15)	Administrative name update and list source update.	

== See also ==
- Subdivisions of Kuwait
- FIPS region codes of Kuwait
- Neighbouring countries: IQ, SA
