= Mahboula =

Town in Kuwait

Mahboula المهبولة
- District
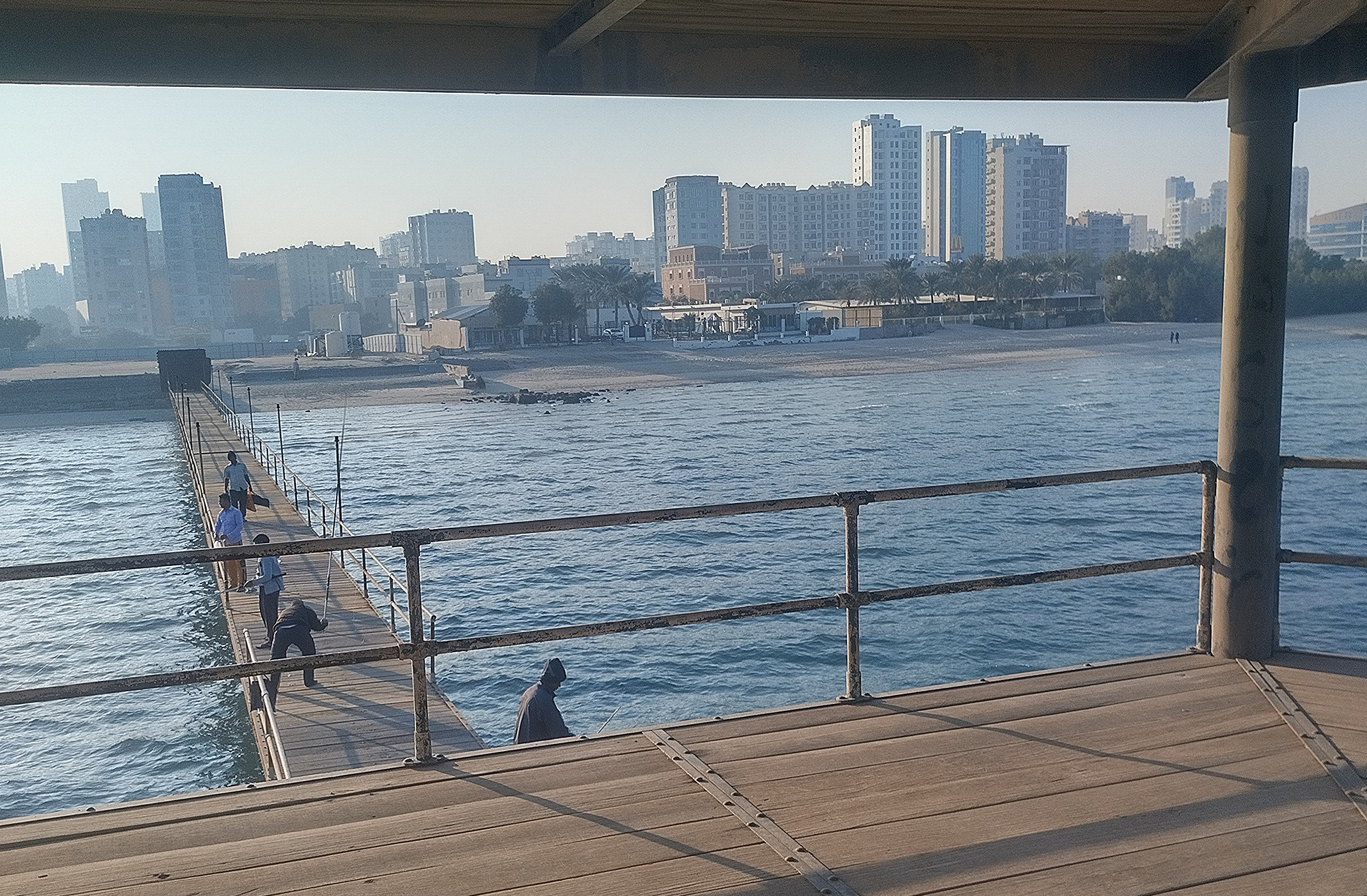
- Interactive map of Mahboula
- Country: Kuwait
- Governate: Ahmadi

Mahboula (Arabic: المهبولة, lit. 'mad woman') is a Kuwaiti district on the Persian Gulf, 36 kilometres (22 mi) south of Kuwait City. It is located in the Ahmadi Governorate between the areas of Fintās and Abu Halifa.

In the mid-2000s, Mahboula was essentially "uninhabited, with a few old buildings and unsafe streets." In 2013, the Kuwait Oil Company announced plans to expand its business, which led to an explosion of residential development in adjacent areas—including Mahboula. By 2016, tens of apartment buildings had sprouted, though the construction quality, environmental impacts, and infrastructure demands were questioned by the Kuwait Times. That newspaper also reported that renting three-to-four-square-metre (32 to 43 sq ft) apartments cost 170–450 Kuwaiti dinars (equivalent to 755–1,998 United States dollars in 2025).

In February 2019, a residential building caught fire, injuring 23 people and stranding over 100 on the floors above the extinguished fire.
