= Qurtoba =

Qurtoba is the name of:

- Córdoba, Spain
- Qurtoba District, one of A'asema city districts in Kuwait
- Qurtoba International School, a school in Jordan

== See also ==
- Al Andalus
