= Al-Qādisiyyah =

Al-Qādisiyyah may refer to:

== Places ==
- Al-Qādisiyyah (historical city), the name of a historical city in southern Mesopotamia, along an important trade route
- Al-Qādisiyyah Governorate, a province in southern Iraq, with its capital at Ad-Diwāniyyah
- Al-Qādisiyyah, Kuwait, a suburb of Kuwait City
- Lake Qadisiyah, a man-made reservoir in Al-Anbar, Iraq

== Sports ==
- Al-Qadisiya Al Khubar, a Saudi Arabian football (soccer) team
- Al Qadisiya Kuwait, a Kuwaiti football (soccer) team
- Shabab Al Ordon Al Qadisiya, a football (soccer) club based in Zarqa, Jordan

== Other ==
- Battle of al-Qādisiyyah, a c. 636 CE engagement between the Sāsānian Empire and the Arab-Muslim army
- University of Al-Qadisiyah, Al Diwaniyah, Qadisiyyah Province, Iraq

== See also ==
- Modern usage of al-Qādisiyyah
