= Gulf Road =

Gulf Road may refer to:

- Gulf Street (Route 25), a major coastal road in Kuwait that passes by major landmarks of Kuwait City.
- Gulf Road (Saudi Arabia), a major coastal road located in the Eastern Province linking the two cities of Dammam and Qatif
