= Funaitees =

Funaitees الفنيطيس
- Area
- Interactive map of Funaitees
- Coordinates: 29°13′15″N 48°5′43″E
- Governorate: Mubarak Al-Kabeer
- Postal code: 52400

Funaitees (Arabic: الفنيطيس) is an area located in the governorate of Mubarak Al-Kabeer in Kuwait. The name in Arabic means "water tanks", referring to the freshwater tanks carried on ships that historically arrived in the area to supply freshwater to various parts of Kuwait.

== History ==
Before creating the Mubarak Al-Kabeer Governorate in 1999, Funaitees was part of Hawalli Governorate.
