= Qurtuba (Kuwait) =

Qurtuba قرطبة
- Location in Kuwait
- Coordinates: 29°18′44″N 47°59′8″E
- Country: Kuwait
- Governorate: Capital Governorate
- Elevation: 79 ft (24 m)

Population (2022)
  - Total: 35,443

Qurtubah (Arabic: قرطبة) is an area in Kuwait City, Kuwait. It is five miles (8 km) from Kuwait International Airport. It comprises five blocks.

Nearby areas include Yarmuk (1.0 nmi or 1.8 km), Adiliya (0.7 nmi or 1.3 km), Da'iya (1.3 nmi or 2.4 km), Hadiqah (1.3 nmi or 2.4 km), Rawda (1.7 nmi or 3.1 km), Abraq Khaytan (1.5 nmi or 2.8 km) and Surrah (2.2 nmi or 4.1 km) .
