= Abraq Khaytan =

- Location in Kuwait
- Coordinates: 29°17′33″N 47°58′8″E
- Country: Kuwait
- Governorate: Farwaniya

Abraq Khaytan or Abrag Khitan (Arabic: أبرق خيطان) is a village in Kuwait. It is located 3 miles from Kuwait International Airport.

Nearby towns and villages include Al `Umariyah (0.8 nm), Al `Udayliyah (0.5 nm), Qurtubah (1.5 nm), As Surrah (1.5 nm), Al Farwaniyah (1.0 nm) and Janub Khaytan (1.3 nm).
