= Al Murqab =

Al Murqab may refer to:

- Al Murqab, Kuwait, a town in the Al Kuwayt governorate
- Al Murqab, Qatar, a settlement in the municipality of Ad Dawhah
