= Rawda, Kuwait =

Rawda الروضة ir-Rōð̣a
- Area
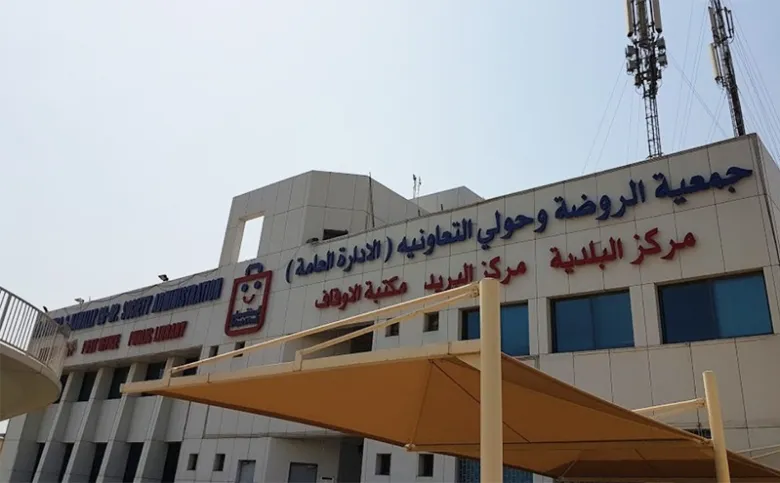
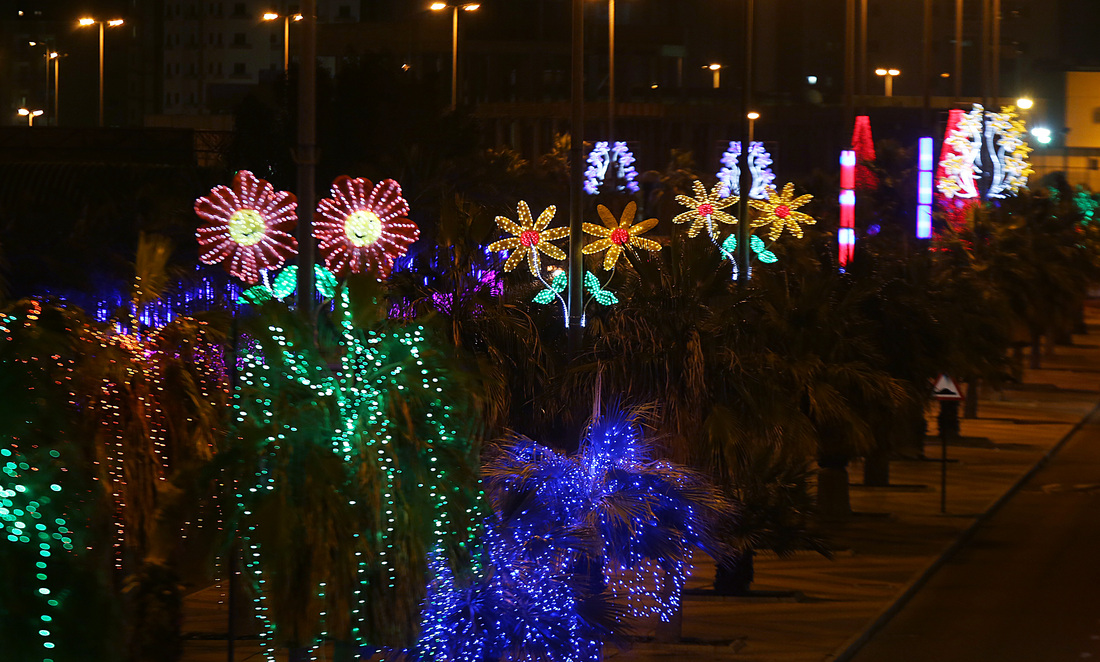
- Rawda & Hawally Cooperative Society Administration (Block 2) Decorative lights as seen on the streets of Rawda
- Etymology: lit. garden; meadow
- An interactive map outlining the area of Rawda
- Coordinates: 29°19′47″N 47°59′55″E; Rawda on Kuwait's Official GIS Maps
- Country: Kuwait
- Governorate: Capital Governorate
- Established: 1960s
- Number Of Blocks: 5

Area
  - Total: 3.1 km^{2} (1.2 sq mi)
- Elevation: 23 m (75 ft)

Population (June 2023)
  - Total: 40,364
  - Density: 13,000/km^{2} (34,000/sq mi)
- Time zone: GMT+3
- Postal code: 77301
- Electoral Circle: 3rd
- Cooperative (Co-Op) Society: Rawda & Hawally Cooperative (Co-Op) Society
- Location: Block 2
- Chair: Moḥammad Al-Kandari

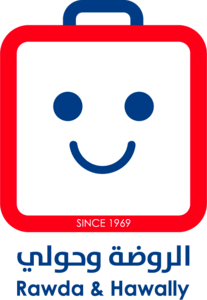
The official logo and branding of the Rawda & Hawally Cooperative Society. It represents a smiling shopping bag, along with a statement that reads "Since 1969" (the year the aforementioned was officially established) and the cooperative society's name shown below. This branding is seen as lit-up signage on the main supermarket and smaller convenience stores' buildings of the area. It is also imprinted on the plastic shopping bags that are used there.

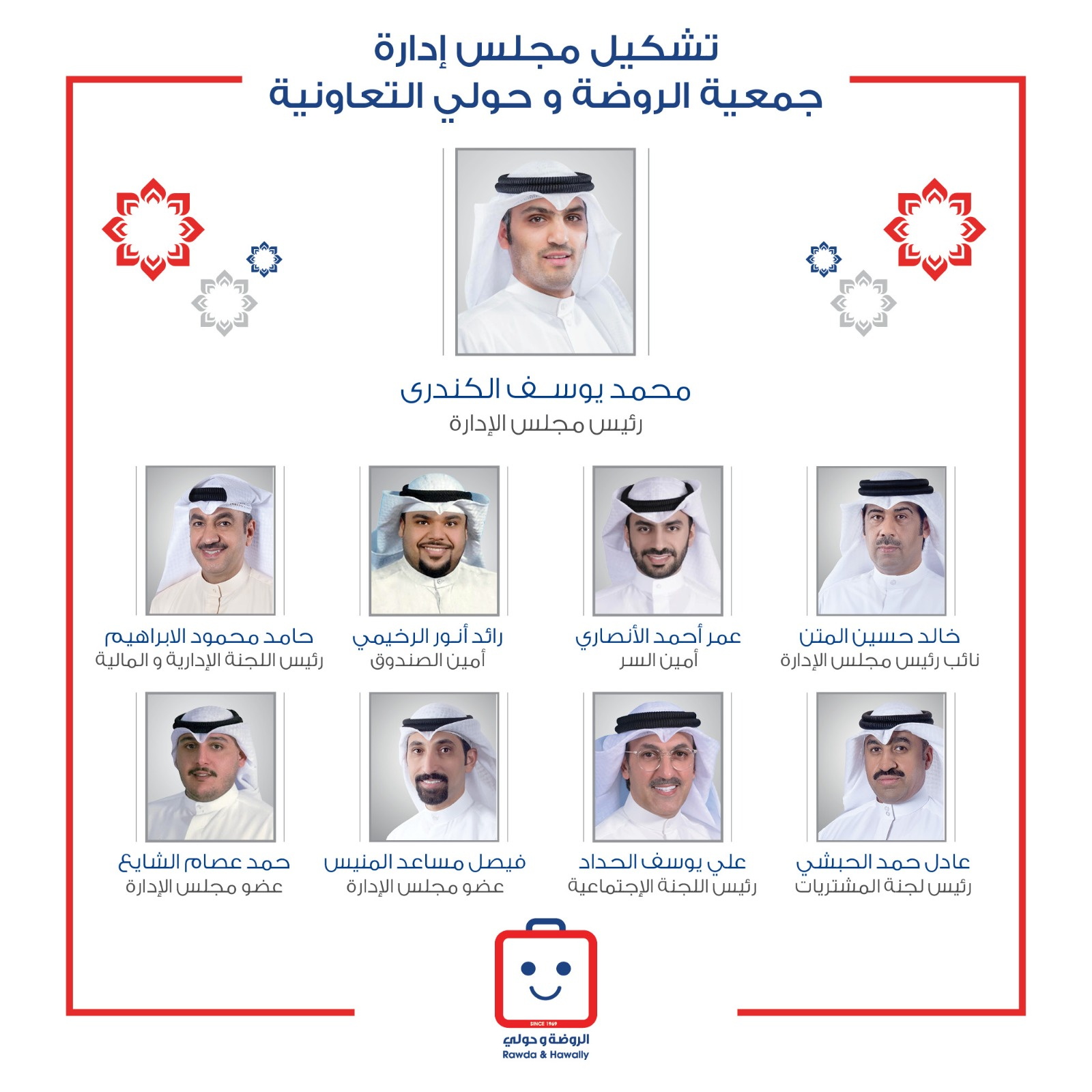
A breakdown of all members of the Rawda & Hawally Cooperative Society's board of directors, with Mohammad Yousef Al-Kandari being at the top, serving as the chairman of the cooperative society's board of directors.

Rawda (Arabic: الروضة Gulf Arabic pronunciation: /ɪrːoːðˤə/) is an area located within the Capital Governorate of Kuwait and is considered a suburb of Kuwait's capital city, Kuwait City. It comprises five residential blocks. The area is served by the Rawda and Hawally Cooperative Society. It neighbors five other areas. Going clockwise, they are Adailiya, Nuzha, Hawally, and Surra. The area falls between, and is served by, Kuwait's 3rd Ring Road and 4th Ring Road from east to west. Kuwait's Route 40 is located to the east of the area, and serves it from the north to the south.

== Naming and etymology ==
"Rawda" means "garden" or "meadow" in Arabic. This area is named for the regional plants and flowers that bloom during the spring season. It was also named for its pure waters and fertile lands and soils, as well as because it was well-known for being a peaceful picnic destination to Kuwaiti residents.

== Brief and detailed history ==
Rawda was first established in the year 1960, where it started off as a division of its neighboring area, Adailiya. Back then, the latter was divided into 2 residential areas, West Adailiya, which became the modern Adailiya today, and East Adailiya, which is now known as the residential area of Rawda. This naming remained up until the year 1970, where the country decided to keep West Adailiya's name, but nix the word "West". On the other hand, East Adailiya was fittingly renamed to "Rawda".

It is considered one of the most important residential areas within the capital city, Kuwait City, after a complete plan was worked on to transform it into a residential area by specialists in the Kuwaiti municipality. Rawda occupies an area of 3 million square meters (3,000,000 m²), throughout which a large amount of groundwater wells are spread. These wells help in flourishing and facilitating the agricultural process, and this is considered one of the most important factors that contributed to giving it this name.

== Geography and climate ==
Rawda is located in eastern Kuwait, specifically in the region of the Arabian Desert.

The area is characterized by a hot, dry desert climate throughout the year, as with the rest of the country. Temperatures in the summer range between 40 and 50 degrees Celsius during the day, and drop during the winter to reach 10 degrees Celsius during the night. Northwestern winds blow through the area during the summer, and southeasterly winds during the winter. These winds cause an increase in the level of air pollution in the area, especially during the spring and summer seasons. As for rain, it falls relatively in the region, and its annual amount ranges between 100mm and 150mm per year.

== Ethnic diversity and cultural variation ==
The region is characterized by ethnic diversity and the spread of different nationalities, and this is the case with most areas of Kuwait, which receive expatriates from everywhere.

The official language in Rawda is Arabic, which is spoken by most of the residents there, especially Kuwaitis. After that comes English, which is spoken by the vast majority of expatriates. It is worth noting that the population census of the Rawda varies constantly due to the entry and exit of citizens to and from it.

== Division, roads, and transportation ==
The area is strategically divided into 5 blocks, and is located between, and comprises, several important roads, highways, and freeways, as the area is bordered to the east by the Morocco Road, and to the north by the Abdullah Ali Al-Mutawa Street. As for the south, there lies the Hassan Bin Ali Al-Rumi Road, and from the west, the famous Damascus Road (which is located on the area's borders).

== Public consumer services ==
One of Rawda's most important strengths is the presence of all the main services that must be available in any area. According to the testimony of residents of the region, it does not suffer from a lack of services as happens with other regions that suffer severely from a lack of basic services.

=== Cooperative Society ===
The Rawda & Hawally Cooperative Society (or Co-Op Society for short) was established in the year 1969 and provides public consumer services, including running the main supermarket and the respective convenience stores for each and every one of the five residential blocks.

Hence the name, Rawda shares this cooperative society with Hawally (which is located adjacent to the former), despite being located within different governorates (Rawda being in the Capital Governorate and Hawally being in the Hawally Governorate). This area's cooperative society is consistently ranked the best or one of the best in the State of Kuwait.

The area also contains a municipality, public library for residents and expatriates, a post office, and a central, public library for residents and expatriates; these are located in the administrative building adjacent to the main supermarket (Rawda & Hawally Cooperative Society Administration).

=== Police station ===
The area hosts the Rawda Police Station, one of the five police stations found in the Capital Governorate of Kuwait. As with all the other police stations operated throughout the country, it is operated by the Kuwaiti Ministry Of Interior (M.O.I).

=== Education ===
According to the Kuwaiti Ministry of Education, two kindergartens operate in Rawda. The area is served by two public primary schools: Amr bin Al-Aas Boys' Primary School and Sumayah Girls' Primary School. Furthermore, the Ibn Al-Atheer Boys' Middle School and Nusaybah Bint Kaab Girls' Middle School serves the area's intermediate students.

As for secondary education, the Abdullah Al-Jaber Al-Sabah Boys' Secondary School and Al-Rawda Girls' Secondary School serve the resident's needs.

=== Healthcare Center ===
Operated by the Kuwaiti Ministry Of Health (M.O.H) and built over an area of 1,200 m², the Rawda Health Center provides a plethora of diagnostic and specialized services to residents.It seeks to provide all the medical needs of all residents of the area, and to meet emergency requests as quickly as possible. There is also a special center for diabetics, equipped and equipped to the highest standards.

=== Entertainment ===
As for entertainment, the area contains many amenities and comfort, unlike other areas whose citizens complain about the lack of parks and gardens. Rawda occupies a high position in attracting tourists due to the beautiful public parks spread everywhere. A large number of concerts and conferences are hosted in these parks, in addition to many important events.

=== Social Reform Society ===
Rawda also contains the Social Reform Society, which is located in Block 3. This association facilitates many activities, and strives to convey the sublime idea of the Islamic religion.

== Real estate ==
As for the real estate market within the region, many homes have been offered for sale in various places within the Rawda area. Real estate and residential projects are one of the most important features of Rawda, and therefore it can be said that it is one of the most appropriate residential areas in Kuwait for those who are looking to settle in suitable and moderate-priced residences and housings.

=== Pricing of offered lands ===
As for the lands that have been offered for sale, no price has been previously determined by the sellers, but there are many lands that have been offered for sale within Rawda.

The minimum price for selling a property, which is set by the owners, is 800,000 Kuwaiti dinars, with slight differences from one property to another. This price was set for a house consisting of 3 floors, on an area of 750 m², and containing an average of 5 apartments. The maximum price for a house reached 1.6 million Kuwaiti dinars, and it is for a house on an area of 1,000 m². However, it's worth mentioning that prices vary depending on the location of the property, its age, and the services it comprises.

== Projects ==
The area is witnessing a distinguished number of projects that have placed it among the vital areas of Kuwait on which the national economy depends.

The most important projects established in the Rawda area revolve around the Kuwait City project for displaced persons west of the Ma’rib region. The basic or initial cost of this project was estimated at $1.2 million to start implementing the project. The project was funded by the National Islamic Authority, as well as the Tarahum team located inside Kuwait. Through the plan developed for this project, it is expected to create 250 housing units, where there will be a special unit for each of the displaced families. Each of these residential units will consist of a living room, kitchen, bathroom and two bedrooms, on a building area of 35 m².

After the completion of the construction process, the competent authorities within the governorate will quickly provide all necessary services. These services will include electricity, drinking water, and sanitation through the establishment of a special sewage station in the area. Special places for treatment and maintaining public health will also be provided, in addition to building schools to provide an opportunity for education for all displaced children.

== Gallery ==
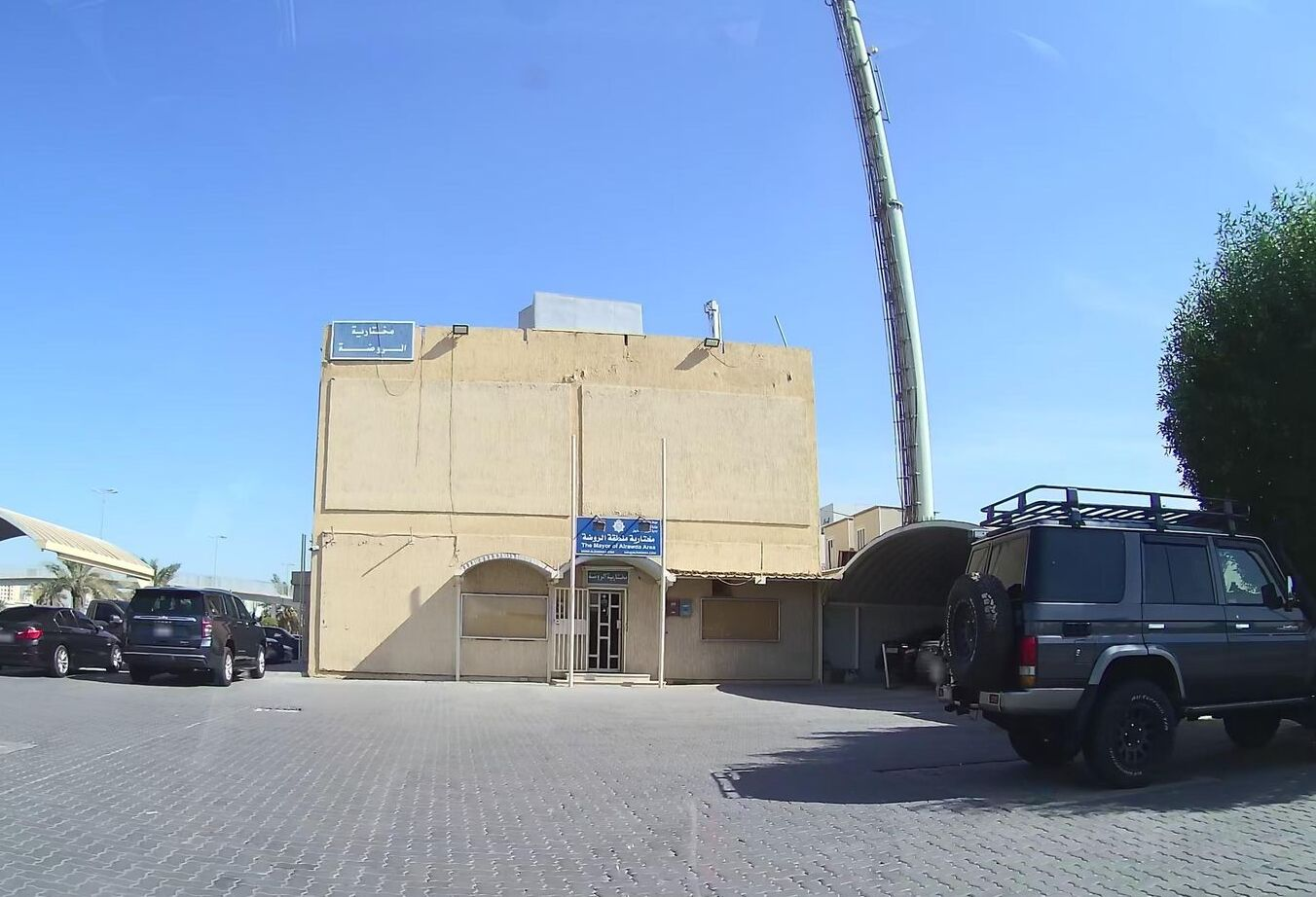
View of the Mayor's Office in Rawda, adjacent to the Rawda Police Station
