= Andalus, Kuwait =

Al Andalus الأندلس
- District
- Location within Kuwait
- Country: Kuwait
- Governorate: Capital Governorate

Area
  - Total: 5.16 km^{2} (1.99 sq mi)

Population (2024)
  - Total: 50,550
  - Density: 9,800/km^{2} (25,400/sq mi)

Al-Andalus (Arabic: الأندلس) is an district of Farwaniya Governorate near Kuwait City, Kuwait.

== Demographics ==
As of June 2024, the population of Andalus was estimated to be 50,550, with a population density of 9,800 per square kilometer. The district has a mix of Kuwaiti nationals and expatriates, contributing to its diverse cultural landscape
