= Adailiya =

Adailiya العديلية li-ʿDēlīya
- Area
- Interactive map of Adailiya
- Location within Kuwait
- Coordinates (29.326546,47.981409): 29°19′N 47°58′E
- Country: Kuwait
- Governorate: Capital Governorate
- Number of blocks: 4

Area
  - Total: 2.68 km^{2} (1.03 sq mi)
- Elevation: 30 m (98 ft)

Population (2022)
  - Total: 21,996
  - Density: 8,210/km^{2} (21,300/sq mi)
- Time zone: UTC+3 (AST)

Adailiya (Arabic: العديلية Gulf Arabic pronunciation: [lɪʕ.deː.liː.jə]) is an area and a suburb of Kuwait City; it is located in the Capital Governorate in Kuwait. It had a population of 21,996 in 2022. Adailiya houses a campus of Kuwait's Public Authority for Applied Education and Training (PAAET) and, temporarily, the colleges of Architecture and Life Sciences at Kuwait University as well as the Kazma Sport Club and religious, cultural, and commercial places. It also has a Water Towers Park.

== History ==
The vicinity of Adailiya comprised today's areas of Rawda, historically East ʿAdailiya, and the current area ʿAdailiya. Before the oil boom, Adailiya was one of the scattered settlements outside of Kuwait City mainly focused on farming wheat and barley. The land was usually described as fertile with abundant groundwater sources.

=== Etymology ===
The etymology behind the name is disputed with essentially two views: the first believes that the name is derived from the balanced (potable, Arabic: معتدل) water sources of the area, and the second posits it is derived from somebody's name

=== Post-oil boom ===
Spurred by the oil revenues, the Kuwaiti government began organizing Kuwait City and its suburbs. It bought land from multiple people in 1958, whose names were published in the official Kuwait Today journal. Kuwait's Municipality finished its scheme for the modern area in the late 1950s, and in December 1970 East ʿAdailiya was officially designates as Rawda while the western part was henceforth known only as ʿAdailiya. It had a population of 8487 people that year and 9748 in 1985. With this, the modern area is fully demarcated between the 3rd Ring Road to the north, 4th Ring Road to the south, Damascus Street (Road 45, which splits East ʿAdailiya (now Rawda) and ʿAdailiya) to the East, and Route 50 Highway to the west, with a big roundabout separating the area into 4 blocks.

=== Gulf War ===
The ʿAdailiya area was active in the resistance against the Iraqi invasion of Kuwait in 1990. A monument with the name of the martyrs can be found in the area's main commercial centre.

== Attractions and points of interest ==
=== Education ===
The ʿAdailiya campus of Kuwait's Public Authority for Applied Education and Training (PAEET) is located in blocks 1 & 4. The block 1 campus used to house Kuwait University's Women College until the university's new campus in Shaddadiya opened up.

=== Sports ===
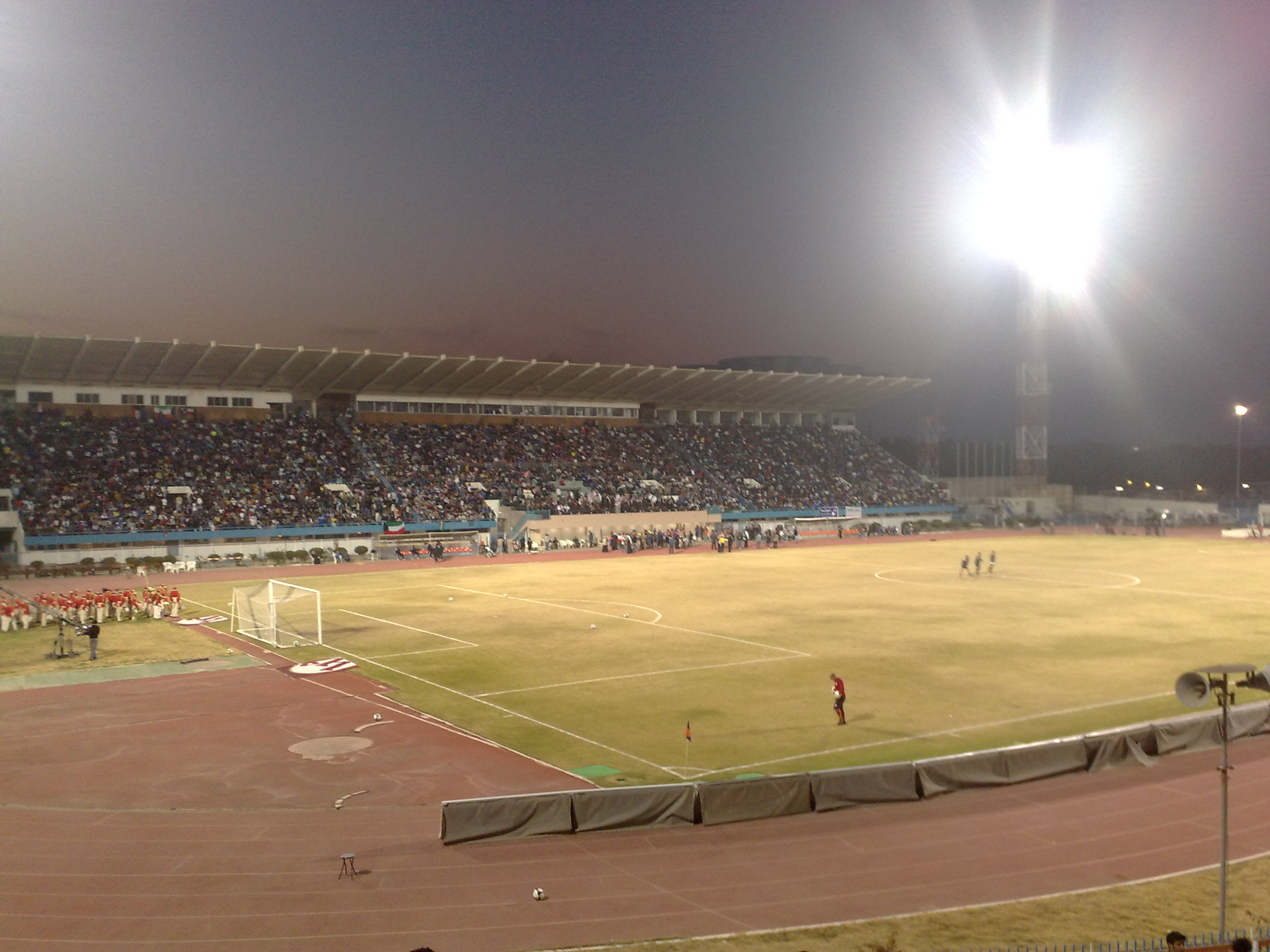
Friendship and Peace Stadium, Block 4

The awards-winning Kazma Sports Club is located in the area's 4th block. Its stadium, the istād aṣ-Ṣadāqa wa as-Salām (Friendship and Peace Stadium) holds seats for up to 16,000 attendants, and was named such for a match held there between Iran and Iraq in 1989 after the end of the Iran–Iraq War. The headquarters of the Kuwait Football Association is also located in ʿAdailiya.

=== Shopping ===
The ʿAdailiya Co-Op Society is the main supermarket and commercial shopping centre in the area.

=== Embassies ===
Country		Block	Source
(Tunisia)	Tunisia	3	Tunisia eVisa online

== Transportation ==
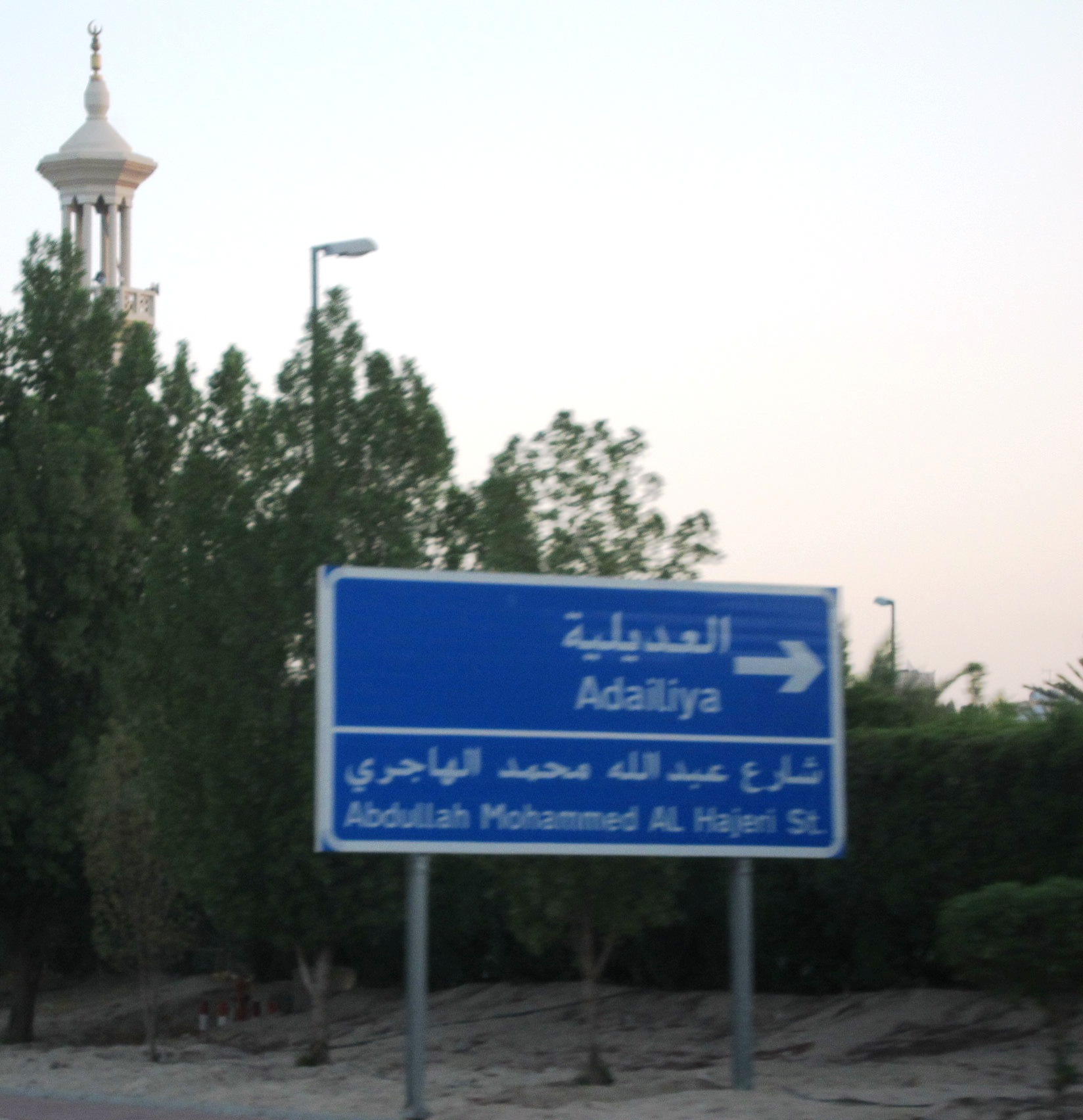
An entrance to ʿAdailiya from Route 50

The area is served by major roads and highways.

Position	Road	Direction
North	3rd Ring Road	East towards Da'iya
West	Route 50	North towards Kuwait City
South	4th Ring Road	West towards Sulaibikhat
East	Damascus Street	South towards South Surra
