= Doha (Kuwait) =

Doha الدوحة
- District
- Location within Kuwait
- Coordinates: 29°20′4″N 47°48′36″E
- Country: Kuwait
- Governorate: Capital Governorate
- Elevation: 9 m (30 ft)

Population (2011)
  - Total: 22,047

Doha (Arabic: الدوحة) is a seaside district of Kuwait City in Kuwait. It comprises seven blocks.

== See also ==
- Doha Port (Kuwait)
