= Areas of Kuwait =

Kuwait is divided into six governorates, and in each there are several areas (Arabic: مناطِق). They are much less commonly called by other names such as districts or towns. However, they are commonly known inside the English-speaking community in Kuwait and are officially translated to as areas. The Arabic word for area, Mintaqah, means both area and region. Areas are further sub-divided into blocks, each of which is referred by a number. All blocks are divided into streets (Arabic: شارع) šāriʿ. Then some areas may be further sub-divided into (Arabic: جادة) Jadda, which is translated to avenue or lane.

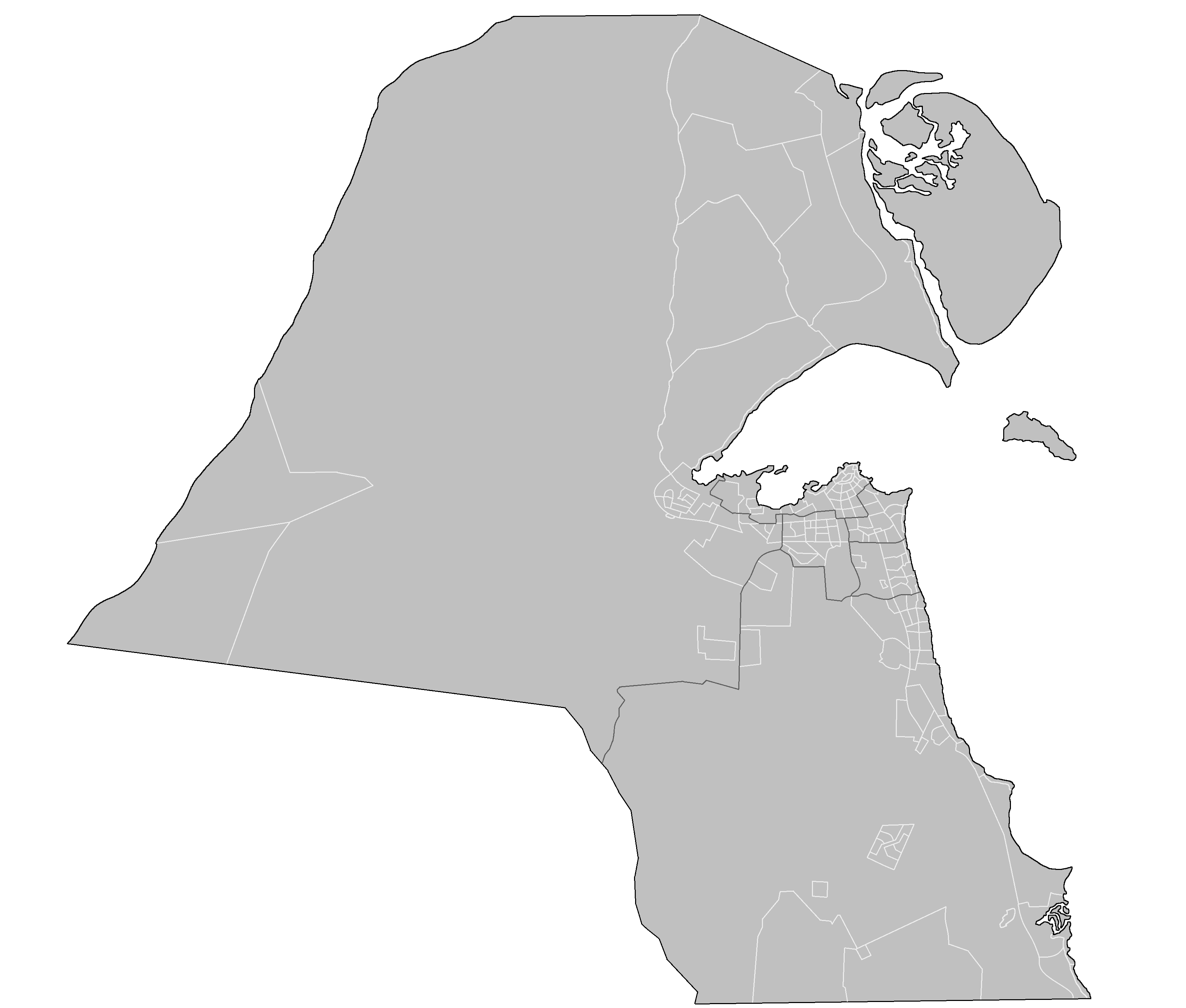
Map of the Areas of Kuwait

Each area in Kuwait has an official governmental facility called a co-op society or just society (Arabic: جمعية). They are mainly supermarkets that provide foods and products and they take part in maintaining some of the areas landmarks, but they're not legally obliged to. They have elected members who manage them. Only residents of the area can vote for their society's membership.

== Asimah Governorate ==
The Capital Governorate (Arabic: العاصمة, romanized: al-ʿĀṣima Gulf Arabic: il-ʿĀṣma) comprises the core areas of Kuwait City and several offshore islands, among them Failaka Island.

Areas of Capital Governorate
Official English	Arabic	Gulf Arabic Transliteration	Year Established	# of Blocks	Population (2011)	Notes
Abdullah Al-Salem	ضاحية عبد الله السالم	Ð̣āḥyat Abdalla is-Sālim	1963	4	13,098	Often referred to simply as ið̣-Ð̣āḥya 'the suburb'.
Adailiya	العديلية	li-ʿDēlīya	1963	4	11,006	
Al-Sour Gardens	حدائق السور	Hādiqat il-sūr	1963	4		
Bneid Al-Gar	بنيد القار	Bnēd il-Gār		1	13,171	
Daiya	الدعية	id-Diʿīya	1957	5	11,289	
Dasma	الدسمة	id-Dasma	1954	6	12,455	
Doha	الدوحة	id-Dōḥa		5	22,047	
Doha Port	ميناء الدوحة	Mina id-Dōḥa			573	
Faiha	الفيحاء	il-Fēḥa	1956	9	12,333	
Failaka Island	فيلكا	Fēliča			147	A historic island. Its name comes from Greek φυλάκιο(ν) - fylakio(n) 'outpost'. Used to be inhabited until the Iraqi invasion of Kuwait. Birthplace of Fēliča (sub)dialect of Kuwaiti Arabic.
Granada	غرناطة	Ġirnāṭa		3	8,752	It was named after the city of Granada in Spain. Appears officially in variant forms, including Granda and Ghornata.
Jibla	جِبْلَة	Jībla		15	4,772	
Kaifan	كيفان	Kēfān	1955	7	17,300	
Khaldiya	الخالدية	il-Xāldīya	1961	4	9,820	
Mansouriya	المنصورية	il-Manṣūrīya	1965	2	5,589	Location of Al-Arabi SC, one of the oldest sports clubs in Kuwait.
Mirqab	المرقاب	il-Mirqab		3	3,699	
Nahdha	النهضة	in-Nahð̣a		3		Formerly East Sulaibikhat
North West Sulaibikhat	شمال غرب الصليبيخات	Šamāl Ġarb li-Ṣlēbixāt		3	7,941	
Nuzha	النزهة	in-Nizha	1963	3	8,372	
Qadsiya	القادسية	il-Qādsīya	1958	9	14,389	
Qortuba	قرطبة	Qurṭuba		5	28,736	Named after Cordoba in Spain
Rawda	الروضة	ir-Rōð̣a	1965	5	21,535	
Shamiya	الشامية	iš-Šāmīya	1955	10	14,708	
Sharq	شرق	Sharq		8	3,699	
Shuwaikh	الشويخ	li-Šwēx	1954	8	3,012	
Shuwaikh Industrial Area	الشويخ الصناعية	li-Šwēx iṣ-Ṣināʿīya		3	2,518	
Shuwaikh Port	ميناء الشويخ	Mina li-Šwēx			185	
Sulaibikhat	الصليبخات	li-Ṣlēbixāt		5	23,686	
Qairawan	القيروان	li-Qayrāwan			15,200	
Surra	السرة	is-Sirra		6	30,264	
Ouha Island	جزيرة عوهة	Jazīrat Ouha			0	
Miskan Island	جزيرة مسكان	Jazīrat Mīskan			0	
Umm an Namil Island	جزيرة ام النمل	Jazīrat Umm in-Namil			0	
Yarmouk	اليرموك	il-Yarmūk		4	15,385	
Total population (2011)					359,245	

Area map of Asimah (Capital) Governorate

== Hawalli Governorate ==
Areas of Hawalli Governorate
English	Arabic	Year established	# of Blocks	Population (2011)	Notes/Landmarks
Bayan	بيان		14	39,799	Known for Bayan Palace
Jabriya	الجابرية		14 (Note: Blocks 1A, 1B, 2, 3A, 3B, 4, 5, 6, 7, 8, 9, 10, 11, 12.)	56,392	Home of multiple hospitals, including Mubarak Al-Kabeer Hospital, Hadi Hospital, and Royale Hayat Hospital, as well as many embassies, the Blood Bank of Kuwait and Health Sciences Campus of Kuwait University.
Rumaithiya	الرميثية	1964	12	41,787	Has the largest number of Husainiya in Kuwait.
Salam	سلام			22,314	
Salwa	سلوى		12	80,283	
Al- Bida'a	البدع		1		Coastal area with many business with sea view.
Anjafa	أنجفة		1		Coastal area with many business with sea view.
Hawally	حولي	1906	11	128,549	Governorate seat.
Hitteen	حطين		4	20,809	
Mishrif	مشرف		7	27,391	
Mubarak Al-Abdullah	مبارك العبدالله		7		
Salmiya	السالمية	1960s	10	196,153	Big commercial activities and a lot of malls.
Shaab	الشعب		8	10,084	
Shuhada	الشهداء		5	15,258	
Al-Siddiq	الصديق		7	26	
Ministries Area	منطقة الوزارات		1		
Zahra	الزهراء		8	23,792	Has the second largest mall 360 Mall in Kuwait.
Total population (2011)				672,910	

== Mubarak Al-Kabeer Governorate ==
The Mubarak Al-Kabeer governorate (Arabic: مبارك الكبير, romanized: Mubārak al-Kabīr Gulf Arabic: Mbārak il-kabīir) is the governorate most recently established. It is named after Mubarak the Great.

Areas of Mubarak Al-Kabeer Governorate
English	Arabic	Population (2011)	Notes/Landmarks
Abu Al Hasaniya	أبو الحصانية	1,682	
Abu Ftaira	أبو فطيرة	57	
Al-Adan	العدان	48,095	
Al Qurain	القرين	33,616	
Al-Qusour	القصور	38,606	
Al-Fnaitees	الفنيطيس	578	
Messila	المسيلة	1,022	
Al-Masayel	المسايل		
Mubarak Al-Kabeer	مبارك الكبير	48,196	Governorate seat.
Sabah Al-Salem	صباح السالم	83,437	
Subhan Industrial	صبحان	2,903	
Wista	الوسطى	570	
West Abu Ftaira Herafiya	غرب ابو فطيرة حرفية		
Total population (2011)		258,813	

== Ahmadi Governorate ==
Areas of Ahmadi Governorate
English	Arabic	Population (2011)	Notes/Landmarks
Abu Halifa	أبو حليفة	29,870	
Mina Abdulla	ميناء عبد الله	24,415	
Ahmadi	الأحمدي	21,469	Governorate seat.
Ali Sabah Al-Salem	علي صباح السالم	42,173	
Egaila	العقيلة	13,579	
Bar Al-Ahmadi	بر الأحمدي	723	Desert area of Al Ahmadi.
Bnaider	بنيدر		
Dhaher	الظهر	33,197	
Fahaheel	الفحيحيل	54,157	
Fahad Al-Ahmad	فهد الأحمد	17,096	
Hadiya	هدية	17,990	
Jaber Al-Ali	جابر العلي	38,868	
Al-Julaia'a	الجليعة		
Khairan	الخيران	1,895	
Mahboula	المهبولة	77,988	
Mangaf	المنقف	73,378	
Magwa	المقوع	32	
Wafra Residential	وفرة السكنية	2,488	
Al-Nuwaiseeb	النويصيب	537	
Riqqa	الرقة	36,058	
Sabah Al Ahmad	صباح الاحمد		
Sabah Al Ahmad Sea City	مدينة صباح الأحمد البحرية		
Sabahiya	الصباحية	56,640	
Shuaiba Industrial	الشعيبة	26	
South Sabahiya	جنوب الصباحية	73	
Wafra	الوفرة	7,856	
Zoor	الزور	2,230	
Fintas	الفنطاس		
Al Shadadiya Industrial	الشدادية الصناعية		
Total population (2011)		588,068	

== Farwaniya Governorate ==
Areas of Farwaniya Governorate
English	Arabic	Population (2011)	Notes/Landmarks
Abdullah Al-Mubarak	عبدالله المبارك	61,441	Also known as West Jleeb Al-Shuyoukh.
Airport District	منطقة المطار	29	
Andalus	الأندلس	42,325	Named after Al-Andalus, the Islamic name for Spain
Ardiya	العارضية	47,928	Known for having Jaber Al-Ahmad International Stadium
Ardiya Herafiya	العارضية حرفية	42,173	
Ishbiliya	اشبيلية	21,848	Named after Seville in Spain
Al-Dajeej	الضجيج	99	
Farwaniya	الفروانية	136,260	Governorate seat.
Ferdous	الفردوس	52,173	
Jleeb Al-Shuyoukh	جليب الشيوخ	227,980	
Khaitan	خيطان	109,901	
Omariya	العمرية	17,373	
Rabiya	الرابية	18,620	
Al-Rai	الري	1,054	Home to The Avenues, The world's second largest covered mall.
Al-Riggai	الرقعي	24,820	
Rehab	الرحاب	15,682	
Sabah Al-Nasser	صباح الناصر	38,507	
Sabah Al-Salem University	جامعة صباح السالم		
West Abdullah Al-Mubarak	غرب عبدالله المبارك		
South Abdullah Al-Mubarak	جنوب عبدالله المبارك		
Sulaibiya Industrial	الصليبية الصناعية		
Total population (2011)		818,571	

== Jahra Governorate ==
Areas of Jahra Governorate
English	Arabic	Population (2011)	Notes/Landmarks
Abdali	العبدلي	6,839	
Al-Mutlaa	المطلاع		
Kazma	كاظمة		
Bahra	بحرة		
Kabd	كبد		
Al-Sheqaya	الشقايه		
Al-Nahda	النهضة	6,756	
Amghara Industrial	أمغرة	8,623	
Bar Al-Jahra	بر الجهراء	1,044	Desert area of Jahra.
Jahra	الجهراء	38,664	Governorate seat.
Jahra Industrial Herafiya	الجهراء الصناعية الحرفية	1,259	
Naeem	النعيم	13,913	
Nasseem	النسيم	18,745	
Oyoun	العيون	31,009	
Qasr	القصر	42,050	
Jaber Al-Ahmad	جابر الأحمد		
Saad Al Abdullah	سعد العبدالله	65,394	
Salmi	السالمي	1,187	
Subiya	الصبية		
Sulaibiya	الصليبية	58,275	
Sulaibiya Agricultural Area	الصليبية الزراعية	6,778	
Sulaibiya Residential	الصليبية السكنية		
Taima	تيماء	52,740	
Waha	الواحة	28,154	
Bubiyan Island	جزيرة بوبيان		
Warbah Island	جزيرة وربة		
Total population (2011)		400,975	

== See also ==
- Electoral districts of Kuwait

== Notes ==
"Public Authority of Civil Information Statistical Reports". Public Authority of Civil Information Statistical Reports. January 6, 2024.
