= Granada, Kuwait =

Granada غرناطة
- Area
- Location within Kuwait
- Coordinates: 29°18′52″N 47°52′26″E
- Country: Kuwait
- Governorate: Capital Governorate

Population (2022)
  - Total: 10,499

Granada (Arabic: غرناطة; also spelled Gharnata\Ghornata\Ghirnata) is an area in the Capital Governorate of Kuwait, and a suburb of Kuwait City. It consists of four blocks, one of which is undeveloped and unpopulated. It was named after the city of Granada in Spain, which had significant Arab/Islamic presence.
