= Doha Port (Kuwait) =

Doha Port Mina Doha ميناء الدوحة
- Port / District
- Location within Kuwait
- Coordinates: 29°21′34″N 47°47′3″E
- Country: Kuwait
- Governorate: Capital Governorate

Population (2011)
  - Total: 573

Doha Port (Arabic: ميناء الدوحة) is a port in Kuwait located at the western extremity of the Capital Governorate. The port contains nine piers which run for a length of 2,600 metres (8,500 ft). Among its facilities are 11 warehouses, a cattle pen and four storage sheds. The port's waters are at a depth of 4.3 metres (14 ft). To the immediate south of the port are residences which accommodate 573 people as of 2011.

== See also ==
- Doha (Kuwait)
