= Zahra (Kuwait) =

Zahra الزهراء Al-Zahra Az-Zahrāʾ
- Area
- Location within Kuwait
- Coordinates: 29.278°N 47.996°E
- Country: Kuwait
- Area: Hawalli Governorate
- Region/Quarter: South Surra

Population
  - Total: 32,064
- Time zone: UTC+3 (AST)

Zahra (Arabic: الزهراء) is an area of Hawalli Governorate in Kuwait. It is divided into eight blocks. Zahra is part of the larger South Surra region which comprises four other areas: Shuhada, Siddeeq, Salām, and Ḥiṭṭīn. The 360 Mall is one of Zahra's prominent attractions. Zahra is also home to many government agencies and administrations.

== Embassies in Zahra ==
Zahra contains many diplomatic embassies including:

Embassies
(Sierra Leone)	Sierra Leone	Block 8
(Jamaica)	Jamaica	Block 8
(Kenya)	Kenya	Block 8
