= Abu Futaira =

Abu Fatira District, also spelled Abu Fataira (Arabic: أبو فطيرة, Standard Arabic: ʾAbū Fuṭayra, Gulf Arabic: Ubu Fṭēra) is an area in and the administrative seat of Mubarak Al-Kabeer Governorate in Kuwait. It is located approximately 20 kilometres (12 mi) from Kuwait City.
