= Jibla, Kuwait =

Jibla جِبْلَة
- District
- Location in Kuwait Jibla (Persian Gulf) Jibla (Asia)
- Coordinates: 29°22′16″N 47°58′17″E
- Country: Kuwait
- Governorate: Capital Governorate

Population (2022)
  - Total: 14,518

Jibla (Kuwaiti Arabic: جِبْلَة, romanized: Jibla, from Qibla قِبْلَة) is a historic area of Kuwait City. It is one of Kuwait's oldest neighbourhoods, although most pre-oil buildings were demolished. The area forms the bulk of the core of modern-day Kuwait City, along with Sharq, Mirgab, and Dasman.
