= Green Island (Kuwait) =

Coordinates: 29.364607°N 48.030242°E

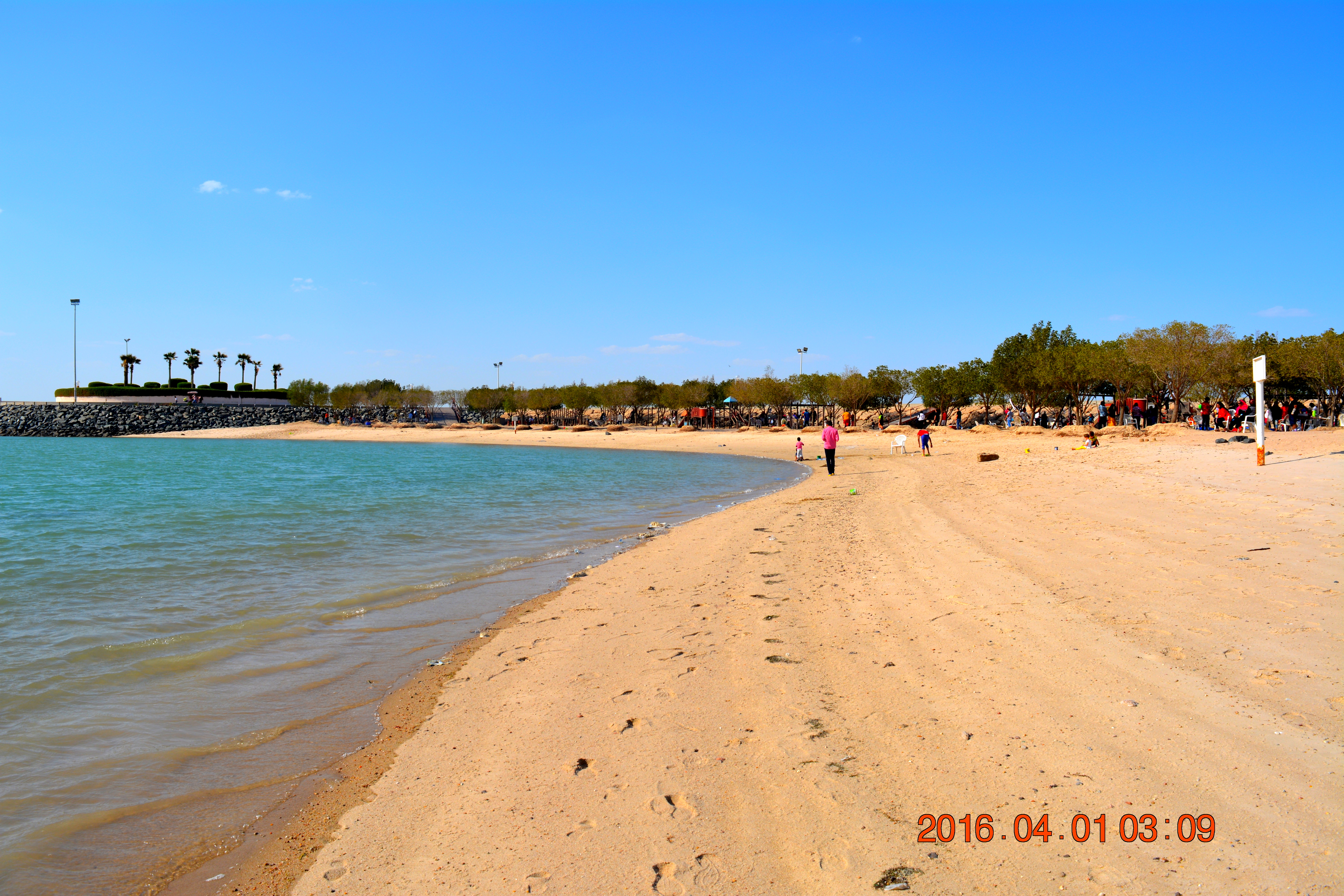
Beach on the Green Island

The Green Island is an artificial island in Kuwait, off the coast of Kuwait City's promenade.

It was opened in 1988 and became a tourist attraction. It is the first artificial island in the Persian Gulf region. It is also a waterside park with picnicking areas.

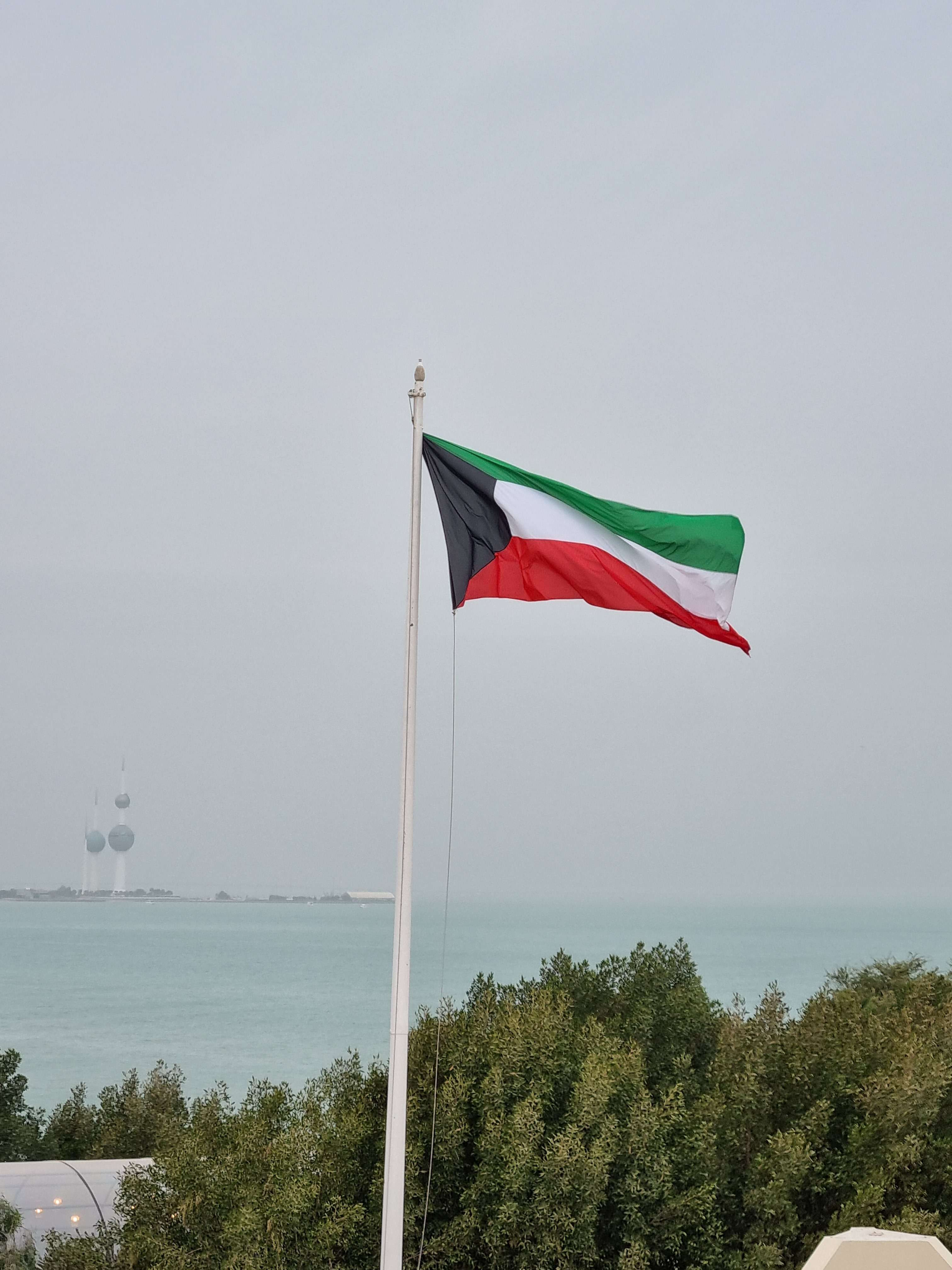
The flag of Kuwait waving in the Green Island

In 2023 Kuwait announced the Green Island Season in celebration of the 62nd National Day and 32nd Liberation Day. The Season was developed by the Touristic Enterprise Company (TEC). The Season opened its doors on 12 February 2023.

In this season the island set up many restaurants, cafés, games, and other entertainment facilities. The TEC, in cooperation with Zain, also hosted one of the largest drone show in Kuwait's history. Using 2,000 Drones to make displays of Kuwait's history, present, and future.

== Gallery ==
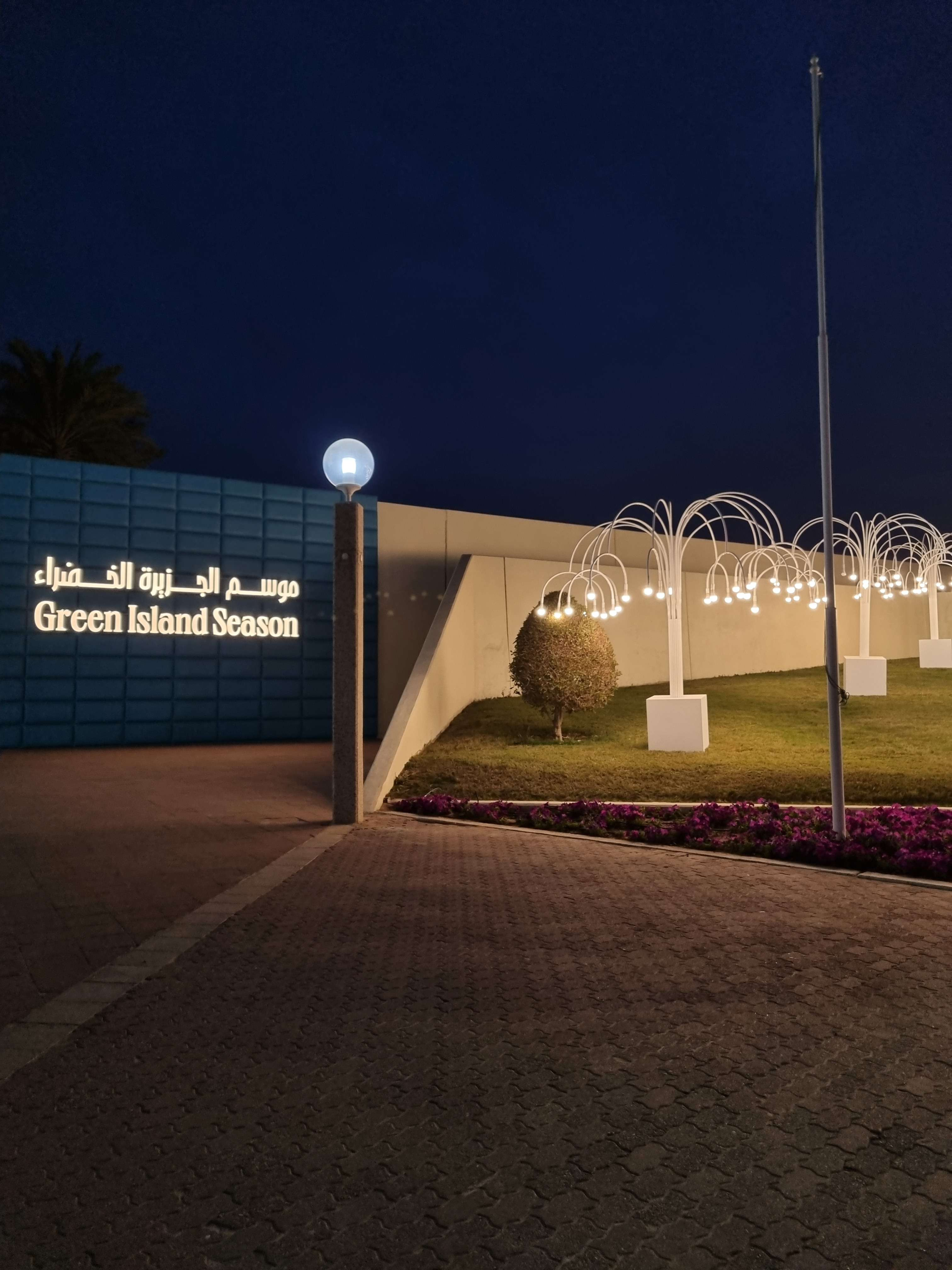
The main Green Island Season gate

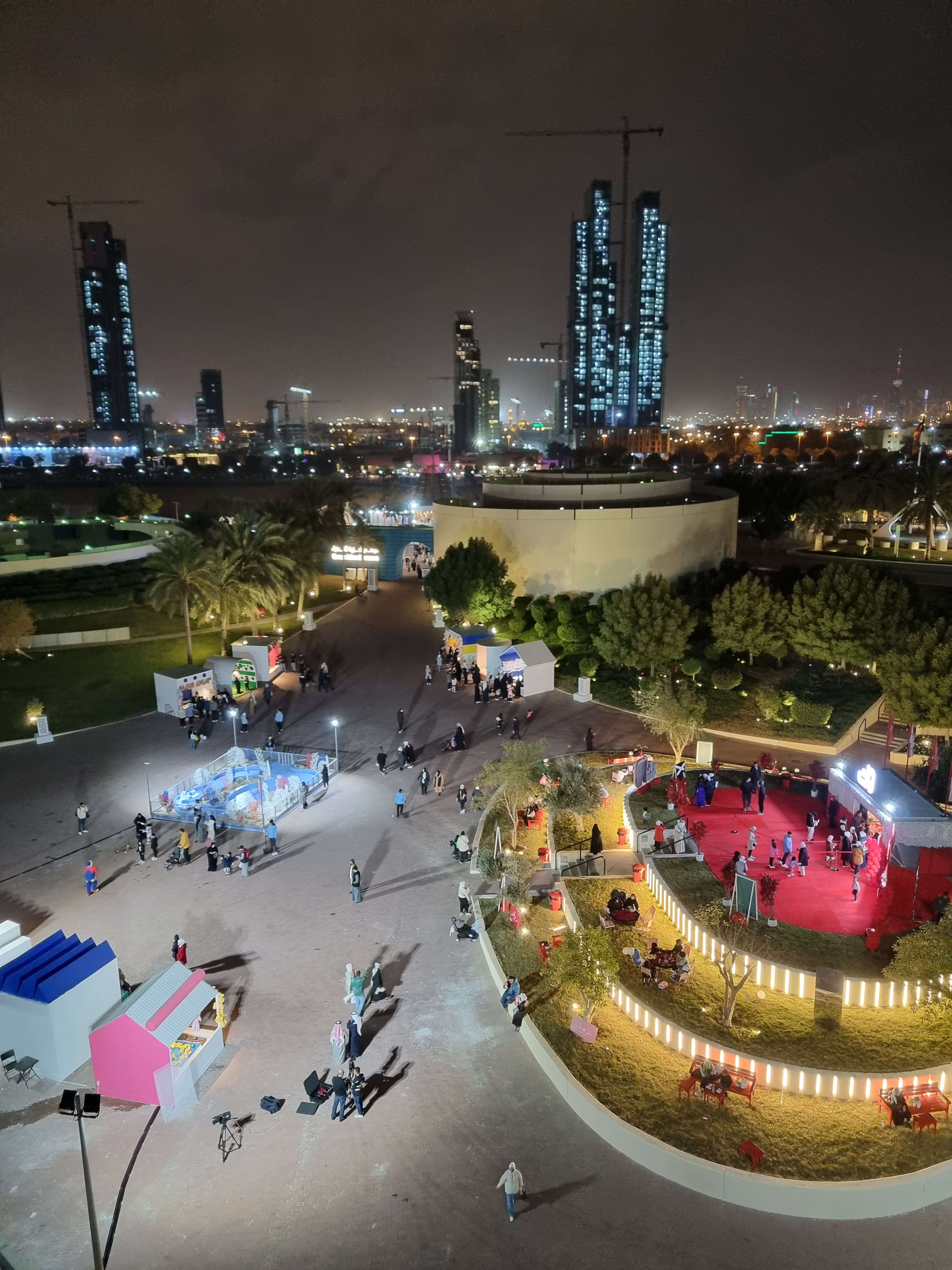
Center of Green Island with booths, games, and restaurants.

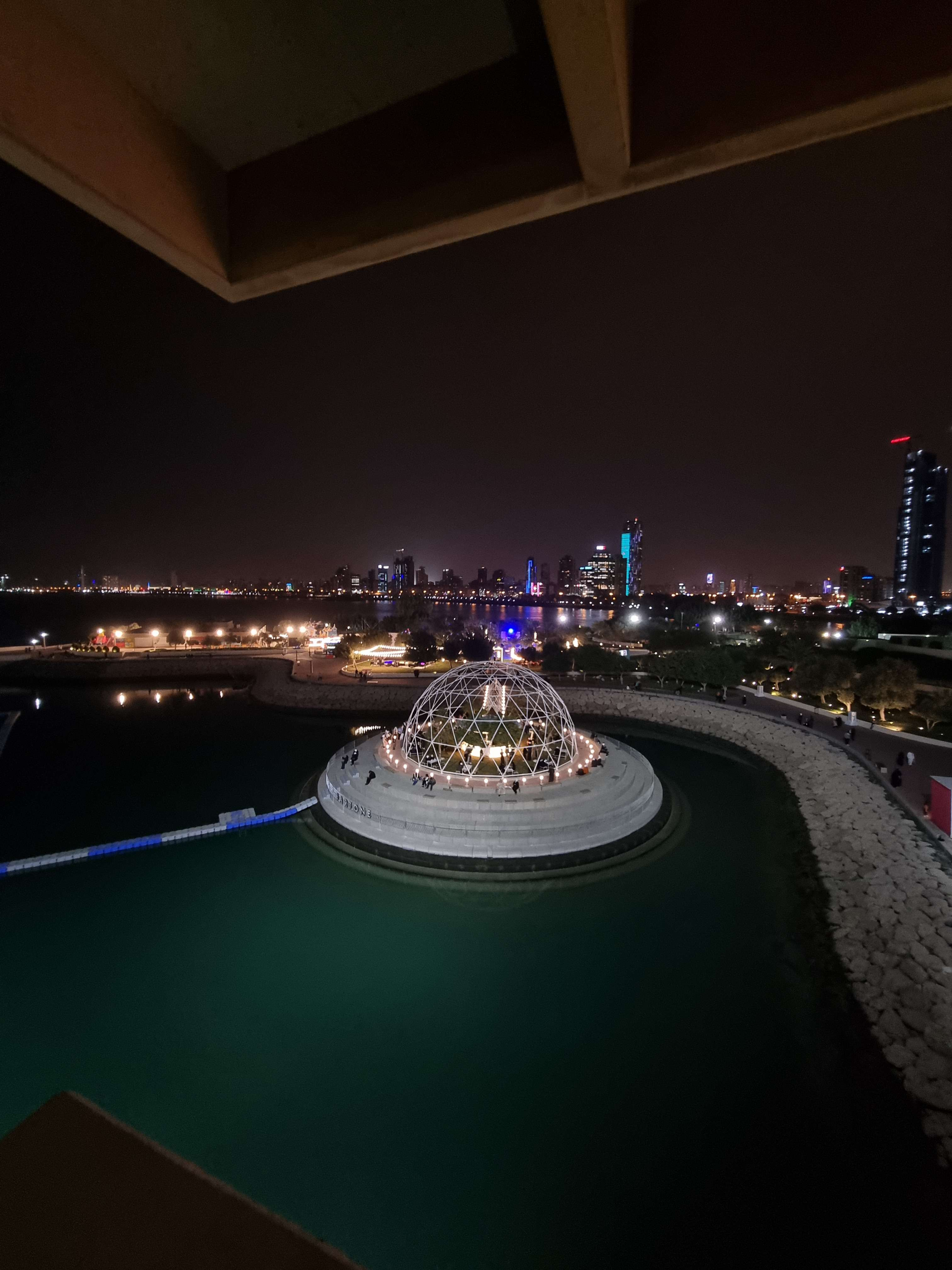
The Dome in The Center of The Green Island.

== See also ==
- List of islands of Kuwait
