= Bneid Al-Gar =

Bnaid Al-Gar بنيد القار Bnēd il-Gār
- Area
- Etymology: pitch discharges (disputed)
- Interactive map of Bnaid Al-Gar
- Coordinates: 29°22′N 48°0′E; Bnēd il-Gār on Kuwait's Official GIS Maps
- Country: Kuwait
- Governorate: Capital Governorate
- Established: Pre-1950
- Blocks: 3

Area
  - Total: 1.32 km^{2} (0.51 sq mi)
- Elevation: 3 m (9.8 ft)

Population (June 2023)
  - Total: 35,796
  - Density: 27,100/km^{2} (70,200/sq mi)
- Time zone: GMT+3
- Electoral Circle: 1st

Bnaid Al-Gar (Arabic: بنيد القار Gulf Arabic pronunciation: [bneːd‿ɪlɡaːr]) is an area in the Capital Governorate of Kuwait and an immediate suburb of Kuwait City. It has a total area of approximately 1,320,220 square metres. The area is served by many main roads in Kuwait, including Gulf Road, Independence Road (Route 30), and Kuwait's 2nd Ring Road with easy access to the 1st Ring Road.

== History and Etymology ==
As one of the oldest settlements in Kuwait, the reason behind the name is disputed. According to one theory, بنيد bnēd is a clipping of the word بنيدر bnēdar, a diminutive of the Arabic-Persian بندر bandar meaning harbour or port that can be found is some place names on the Gulf coasts. The word قار gār means pitch, and thus it was named due to the natural oil discharges from Qarū Island. The Standard Arabic equivalent would be Bunayd Al-Qār, which is also an alternative transliteration of the area's name.

== Demographics ==
According to the public Authority for civil information, as of 30 June 2022, there are 31,111 residents. 2.5% are Kuwaiti and 97.5% are non-Kuwaiti. The area has a significant Shia population, and is known for hosting many old husainiyas, Shi'ite bookstores, as well as a Hawza.
