= Shuwaikh Industrial Area =

Shuwaikh Industrial Area الشويخ المنطقة الصناعية
- District
- Location within Kuwait
- Coordinates: 29°19′45″N 47°56′43″E
- Country: Kuwait
- Governorate: Capital Governorate

Population (2011)
  - Total: 2,518

Shuwaikh Industrial Area (Arabic: الشويخ المنطقة الصناعية) is an area of Kuwait City in Kuwait. It comprises three separate districts: Shuwaikh Industrial-1, Shuwaikh Industrial-2, and Shuwaikh Industrial-3. The industrial area is also located near Shuwaikh proper, Shuwaikh Port, Shuwaikh Commercial Area, Shuwaikh Educational Area and Shuwaikh Health Area; all of which form their own census-designated districts.

== See also ==
- Shuwaikh Port
- Shuwaikh proper
