= Mirgab =

Al Murqab المرقاب
- Area
- Location in Kuwait
- Coordinates: 29°21′56″N 47°58′41″E
- Country: Kuwait
- Governorate: Capital Governorate

Population (2011)
  - Total: 3,699

Al Murqab (Arabic: المرقاب) is an area in Kuwait City, Kuwait. It is located in the Capital Governorate 8 miles (13 km) from Kuwait International Airport.

Nearby areas include As Salihiyah (0.5 nmi or 1 km), Jibla (0.6 nmi or 1.1 km), Al Kuwayt (0.2 nmi or 0.4 km), Umm Siddah (0.8 nmi or 1.5 km) and Al Mansuriyah (0.6 nmi or 1.1 km).
