= Shamiya, Kuwait =

Shamiya الشامية
- District
- Location within Kuwait
- Coordinates: 29°21′6″N 47°58′0″E
- Country: Kuwait
- Governorate: Capital Governorate

Population (2022)
  - Total: 18,089

Shamiya (Arabic: الشامية) is an area of Kuwait City; it is located near the coast in the Capital Governorate in Kuwait. It comprises 10 blocks.
