= Sulaibiya =

Neighbourhood in Kuwait

Coordinates: 29°17′10″N 47°49′05″E

Sulaibiya (Arabic: الصليبية) or Al-Sulaibiya is a suburban neighbourhood in Al Jahra Governorate, Kuwait. It covers an area of roughly 12 square kilometres (4.6 sq mi) and has a population of around 38,000 residents. Established in 1980, the area initially served as a camp for Bedoon (stateless) people. In 1982, it was developed into a residential area.

The suburb has become famous for being a haven for Bedoon residents, a marginalized group that has been caught in legal limbo, unable to gain citizenship while facing discrimination and lack of access to employment, education, and social services available to Kuwaiti nationals.

Sulaibiya is home to two industrial areas containing several warehouses and concrete factories. Moreover, it accommodates several agricultural and dairy farms, and the residential area consisting of 10 blocks.

A plan to relocate the neighbourhood for future development is underway and will involve transferring all residents of Sulaibiya to the in-development site of Al-Naayem.

On 31 July 2012, Sulaibiya set a new record for the highest temperature in Asia, reaching 53.6 °C (128.5 °F).

== Infrastructure ==
=== Wastewater treatment plant ===
As of 2015, the General Electric-built waste-water treatment plant in the district waste the world's largest membrane technology-based water treatment facility handling 600,000 cubic meters of water a day.

=== Tire graveyard ===
Video of fire fighting during the 2020 fire by the Kuwait Fire Force
- https://twitter.com/kff_kw/status/1317053501869051904

The industrial area contains a waste disposal area that includes the world's largest tire dump. It has been under development since at least 2010. In April 2021, a fire was reported at the site. In October 2020 a major tire fire in the graveyard was visible from space, burning 25,000 square meters of the deposit or about 1 million tires. A previous fire happened in the site during 2012. Both fires caused severe air pollution, and tire fires release large amount of heavy metals and oils that can contaminate the surrounding environment. Following the fire, the Kuwait Environment Public Authority said it would dispose of the tires.
