= Qadsiya (Kuwait) =

Qadsiya القادسية
- District
- Location within Kuwait
- Coordinates: 29°20′58″N 48°0′11″E
- Country: Kuwait
- Governorate: Capital Governorate
- Elevation: 26 m (85 ft)

Population (2011)
  - Total: 14,389

Qadsiya (Arabic: القادسية) is an area in Capital Governorate in Kuwait City, Kuwait. It was named after Al-Qadisiyyah in Iraq, the site of the Battle of al-Qādisiyyah. According to the 2011 census, it has a population of 14,389.
