= Surra, Kuwait =

Coordinates: 29.0000°N 48.0000°E

Surra is a residential area located in the Capital Governorate in Kuwait City, Kuwait. It is located west of Jabriya and east of Qurtuba. It has six residential blocks and is considered home to about 35,366 persons. Its southern section is in Hawalli Governorate.

The word "Surra" is an Arabic word meaning "navel". This name was chosen by the mayor at the time of foundation, Talal Al-Sharekh, for the area because of its central location within Kuwait's urbanized landmass.

There are three major roads in Surra. The main road, "as-Surra Road," and "Ali 'ibn Abi Tālib Road," which crosses Surra from 4th Ring to 5th Ring roads, and also "Tariq Bin Ziyād Road" which leads to "Damascus Street."

== Embassies in Surra ==
Afghanistan Bahrain Cambodia Kenya Italy	Indonesia Finland Slovakia Spain Sudan Venezuela
