= Nuzha =

Nuzha النزهة
- District
- Location within Kuwait
- Coordinates: 29°20′3″N 47°59′30″E
- Country: Kuwait
- Governorate: Capital Governorate

Population (2022)
  - Total: 14,788

Nuzha (Arabic: النزهة) is an area in Kuwait City; it is located in Al Asimah Governorate in Kuwait. Its population in 2022 was 14,788.

== Embassies in Nuzha ==
Embassies in Kuwait

Brazil
Tanzania
