= Kaifan =

Kaifan كيفان
- District
- Location within Kuwait
- Coordinates: 29°20′19″N 47°57′42″E
- Country: Kuwait
- Governorate: Capital Governorate
- Elevation: 18 m (59 ft)

Population (2022)
  - Total: 28,919

Kaifan (Arabic: كيفان) is an area in Kuwait City; it is located in the governorate of Al Asimah in Kuwait. is home to Kuwait SC. It is one of the prestigious areas in Kuwait and also known for holding the first cooperative society in Kuwait. Lands in this area tend to be some of the most expensive in the Gulf. Land sizes range from 750 to 1250 square metres and as of the early 2000s, the average worth of a 1,000 square metre piece of land is between 1.2 and 2.5 million Kuwaiti dinars.

== Embassies in Kaifan ==
- Embassies in Kuwait

Indonesia	Romania
