= Gulf Street =

Street in Kuwait

Gulf Street/Gulf Road
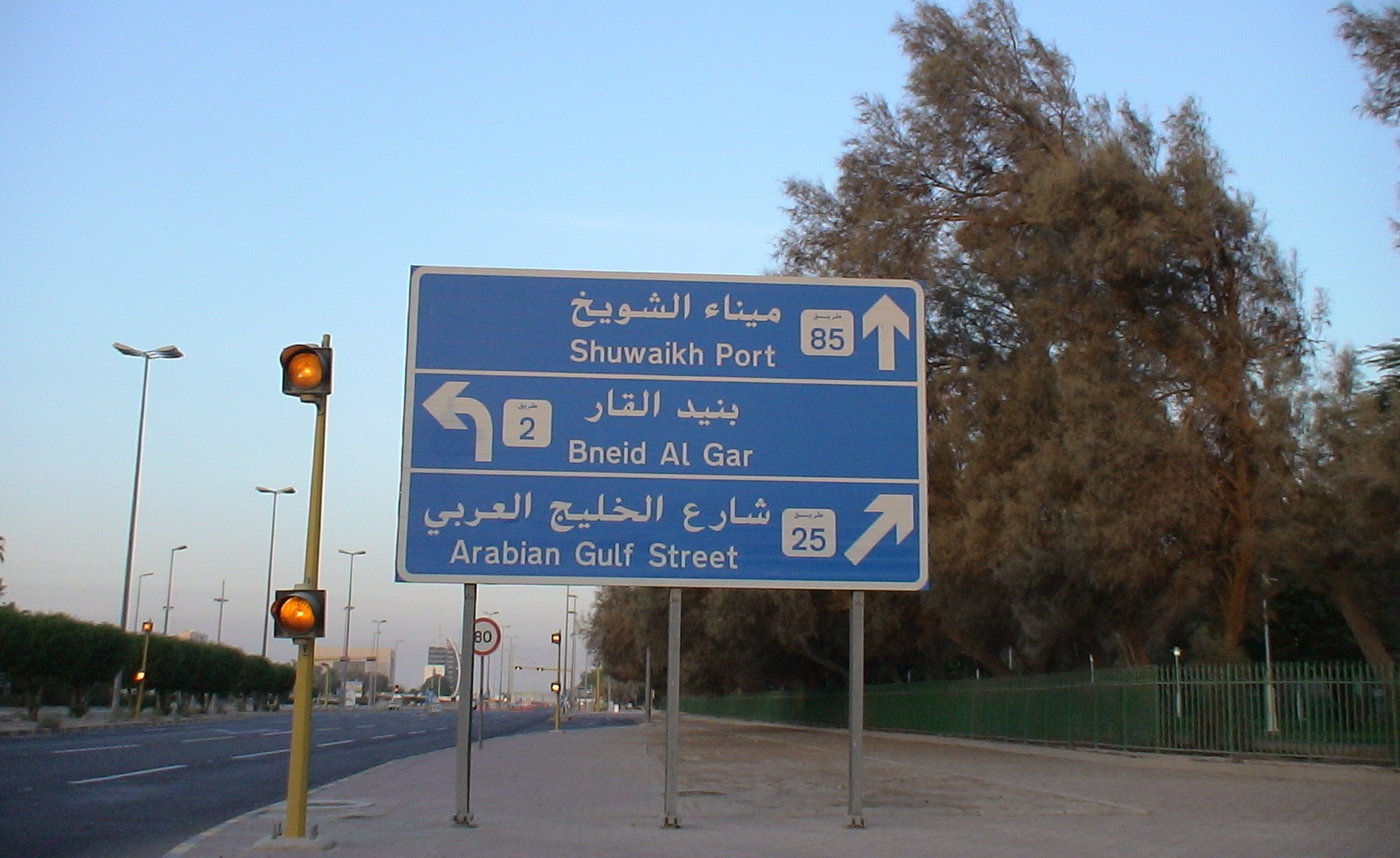

Location
- Country: Kuwait

Highway system
- Roads in Kuwait

The Arabian Gulf Road (Arabic: شارع الخليج العربي), commonly referred to simply as Gulf Road (Arabic spelling: شارع الخليج, Kuwaiti Arabic pronunciation /ʃa:rɪʕ ɪlχɐliːd͡ʒ/) is the most prominent road in Kuwait, located in the capital of the country, Kuwait City. It was named as such as it coasts the Arabian Gulf (and the smaller body of Kuwait Bay within it) in all of its distance due to its semi-circular shape.

Most of the prominent Kuwait City landmarks are located on the Gulf Road. Those include, but are not limited to, Kuwait Towers, Kuwait National Assembly, Kuwait Stock Exchange, Kuwait Opera House, Dasman Palace, Seef Palace, The Scientific Centre of Kuwait, The Green Island, The Grand Mosque of Kuwait and many foreign embassies and consulates.

== See also ==
- Roads in Kuwait
