= Fintās =

Area in Kuwait

Coordinates: 29.17°N 48.12°E

Al Fintas (Arabic: الفنطاس) is an area located in the Ahmadi Governorate, Kuwait.

A suburb located to the south of Kuwait City, Al Finţās has about 23,000 inhabitants, and is situated at 29.17° North latitude, 48.12° East longitude. It is 17 meters above the sea level.

The beach along the area has suffered from plastic and tar pollution from plastic manufacturing and oil shipping.
