= Khaldiya (Kuwait) =

Khaldiya الخالدية
- District
- Location within Kuwait
- Coordinates: 29°19′33″N 47°57′36″E
- Country: Kuwait
- Governorate: Capital Governorate
- Elevation: 14 m (46 ft)

Population (2022)
  - Total: 19,562

Khalidiya (Arabic: الخالدية) is an area in Kuwait City; it is located in the governorate of Al Asimah in Kuwait.

Khaldiya, located in the heart of Kuwait, specifically between the 3rd and 4th ring roads, is one of the country’s well-established neighborhoods.

Khaldiya, established was established in 1961. It is 2,569 km^{2}, and according to the statistics of the Public Authority for Civil Information in 2008, its population size reached 16,851.

The City of Khaldiya is divided into four sections, each of which is referred to as a block; Block 3 is the largest, including the College of Engineering and Petroleum and the College of Science, both of which are part of Kuwait University.

Al Khaldiya area is 3km away from the Adailiya area; it is also bordered by the Kaifan area, Yarmouk area, and Shuwaikh industrial area. It is 6.2km away from the center of Kuwait City and almost 10.5km away from the Duty-Free area.
