= Shuhada, Kuwait =

Hawalli Governorate in Kuwait City, Kuwait

Shuhada الشهداء Al-Shuhada
- Area
- Location within Kuwait
- Coordinates: 29°16′19.2″N 48°01′48.4″E
- Country: Kuwait
- Area: Hawalli Governorate
- Region/Quarter: South Surra

Area
  - Area: 2.43 km^{2} (0.94 sq mi)
  - Metro: 2.43 km^{2} (0.94 sq mi)
- Elevation: 10 m (33 ft)

Population (2026)
  - Area: 17,239
  - Density: 7,094/km^{2} (18,370/sq mi)
  - Urban: 17,239
  - Urban density: 6,449/km^{2} (16,700/sq mi)
- Time zone: UTC+3 (AST)

Shuhada (Arabic: الشهداء, meaning: The Martyrs) is an area of the Hawalli Governorate in Kuwait.

== Embassies ==
Embassies
Republic of Malawi
