= Constituencies of the National Assembly of Kuwait =

Regions in Kuwait electing members to National Assembly

Kuwait is divided into five multi-member constituencies for the election of members to the unicameral National Assembly. These five electoral districts represent 112 residential areas distributed among the six governorates of Kuwait. Each constituency, regardless of population, directly elects 10 representatives to the National Assembly via plurality vote, for a total of 50 members.

== Constituencies ==
Constituency	Electorate 2022	Notes
First	100,185	
Second	90,478	
Third	138,364	
Fourth	208,971	
Fifth	257,913	

== See also ==
- Demographics of Kuwait
- Elections in Kuwait
