= Yarmouk, Kuwait =

Area of Kuwait City

Yarmouk is an area of Kuwait City in the Al Asimah Governorate in Kuwait. Divided into four blocks, its main dwellers have moved to the area from Al-Faiha as their families grew. Its main street is called Abdul-Aziz Bin-Baz Street which extends from the entrance and the Fourth-Ring Road all the way to the other side. It is also one of the most prestigious suburbs in Kuwait, alongside other suburbs such as Nuzha, Shuwaikh and Dahia Abdullah Al Salem. Its population is 25,000.

Prominent Kuwaiti families in Yarmouk include the: Al-Sabah, Al Abdali, Al Zamel, Al Saqqaf, Al Wazzan, Al Senan, Al Obaid, Al Shehab, Al Bahar, Al Najdi, Al Jasem, Al Matrouk, Alabdulhadi, Al Wera, Al Ghanim, Alroomi and Aldhubaib, Alsahoo, Alansari families.

== Embassies in Al Yarmouk ==
Azerbaijan
Brazil
China, PR
Morocco
Vatican City
