= Shuwaikh =

Shuwaikh الشويخ
- District
- Location within Kuwait
- Coordinates: 29°21′18″N 47°57′21″E
- Country: Kuwait
- Governorate: Capital Governorate
- Elevation: 8 m (26 ft)

Population (2011)
  - Total: 3,012

Shuwaikh (Arabic: الشويخ) is a seaside district of Kuwait City in Kuwait. It comprises eight blocks. Shuwaikh also has an industrial area, the nation's key port that shares the district's name, a commercial area, a healthcare area and an education area; all of which form their own census-designated districts.

== Area ==
The area of Shuwaikh is partly industrial and partly rural. It includes Souq al-Juma, which is a Friday market that sells furniture, clothes, new and used goods, and much more. Next to the Souq al-Juma is an animal market that has been criticized for the extensive animal abuse committed by the sellers of the animals. Shuwaikh is commonly recognized for the Shuwaikh port which is Kuwait's most important port because it contains a power station and water desalination which supplies all of Kuwait City.

== See also ==
- Shuwaikh Port
- Shuwaikh Industrial Area
