= Da'iya =

Da'iya الدعية
- District
- Location within Kuwait
- Coordinates: 29°21′N 48°0′E
- Country: Kuwait
- Governorate: Capital Governorate
- Elevation: 15 m (49 ft)

Population (2011)
  - Total: 11,289

Al Da'iya (Arabic: الدعية) is an area located in Kuwait City that was established around 1960. It is part of the Capital Governorate. It is named after Sheikh Duaj Al Salman Al Sabah, the first to live in this area who the leader of the Kuwaiti army which fought in the Battle of Himth in 1919. Daiya is the headquarters of the Kuwait Handball Association.
