= Faiha =

Faiha الفيحاء
- Area
- Location within Kuwait
- Coordinates: 29°20′N 47°59′E
- Country: Kuwait
- Governorate: Al Asimah Governorate

Population (2022)
  - Total: 23,287
- Time zone: UTC+3 (AST)

Al-Faiha (Arabic: الفيحاء) is an urban area located in Al Asimah Governorate in Kuwait.

Al Faiha is a residential area located 1.6 km from Kuwait City between the second and third ring roads. The Al Turiki Museum is in Al Faiha. It is divided into 9 blocks. Block 5 is the central block which is home to the biggest supermarket in Faiha, the police station, gas station and many other stuff. Faiha was founded in 1953.
