= Mansouria, Kuwait =

Mansouria المنصوريَّة
- District
- Location within Kuwait
- Coordinates: 29°21′34″N 47°59′40″E
- Country: Kuwait
- Governorate: Capital Governorate
- Elevation: 12 m (39 ft)

Population (2022)
  - Total: 9,071

Mansouria (Arabic: المنصوريَّة, romanized: Mansūriya) is an area in Capital Governorate in Kuwait City. It is home of Al-Arabi Sporting Club.
