= Capital Governorate (Kuwait) =

Governorate of Kuwait

Capital Governorate محافظة العاصمة Muḥāfaẓat al-ʿĀṣima Asimah Governorate
- Governorate
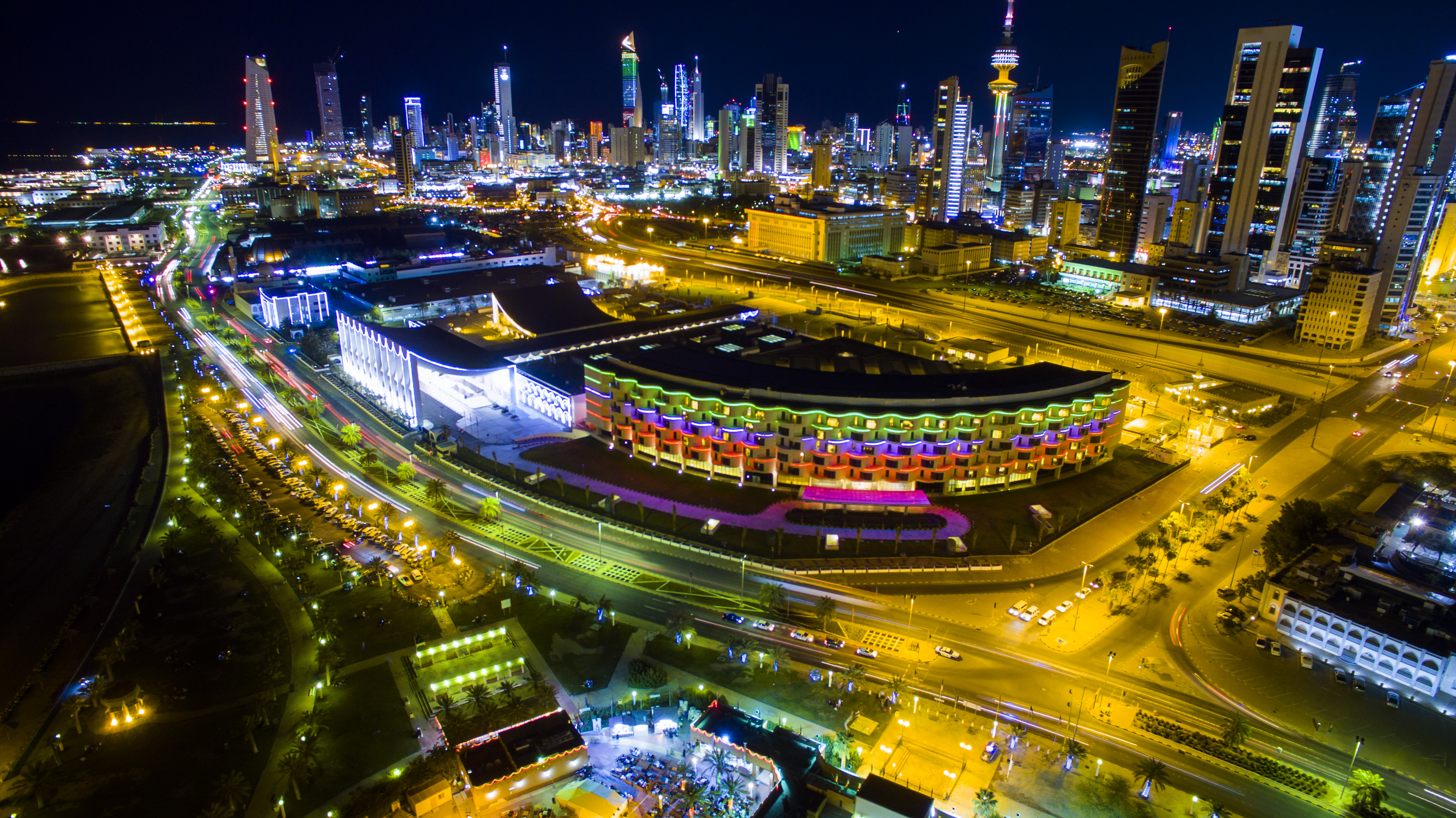
- Kuwait National Assembly in Kuwait City

- Map of Kuwait with Al-ʿĀṣima highlighted
- Coordinates (Al Kuwait): 29°20′03″N 47°58′53″E
- Country: Kuwait
- Established: 1962
- Capital: Kuwait City
- Areas: 37

Area
  - Total: 175 km^{2} (68 sq mi)

Population (2021)
  - Total: 574,839
  - Density: 3,280/km^{2} (8,510/sq mi)
- Time zone: UTC+03 (AST)
- ISO 3166 code: KW-KU

Capital Governorate or Asimah Governorate (Note: Arabic: محافظة العاصمة, romanized: Muḥāfaẓat al-ʿĀṣima; Gulf Arabic: il-ʿĀṣma), also referred to as Al Kuwayt, is one of the six governorates of Kuwait. It includes the seat of the government at the capital Kuwait City and several islands including the Failaka Island. The governorate occupies a land area of 175 km^{2} (68 sq mi) and is sub-divided into 34 areas. As per the 2021 census, it had a population of 574,839.

== Geography ==
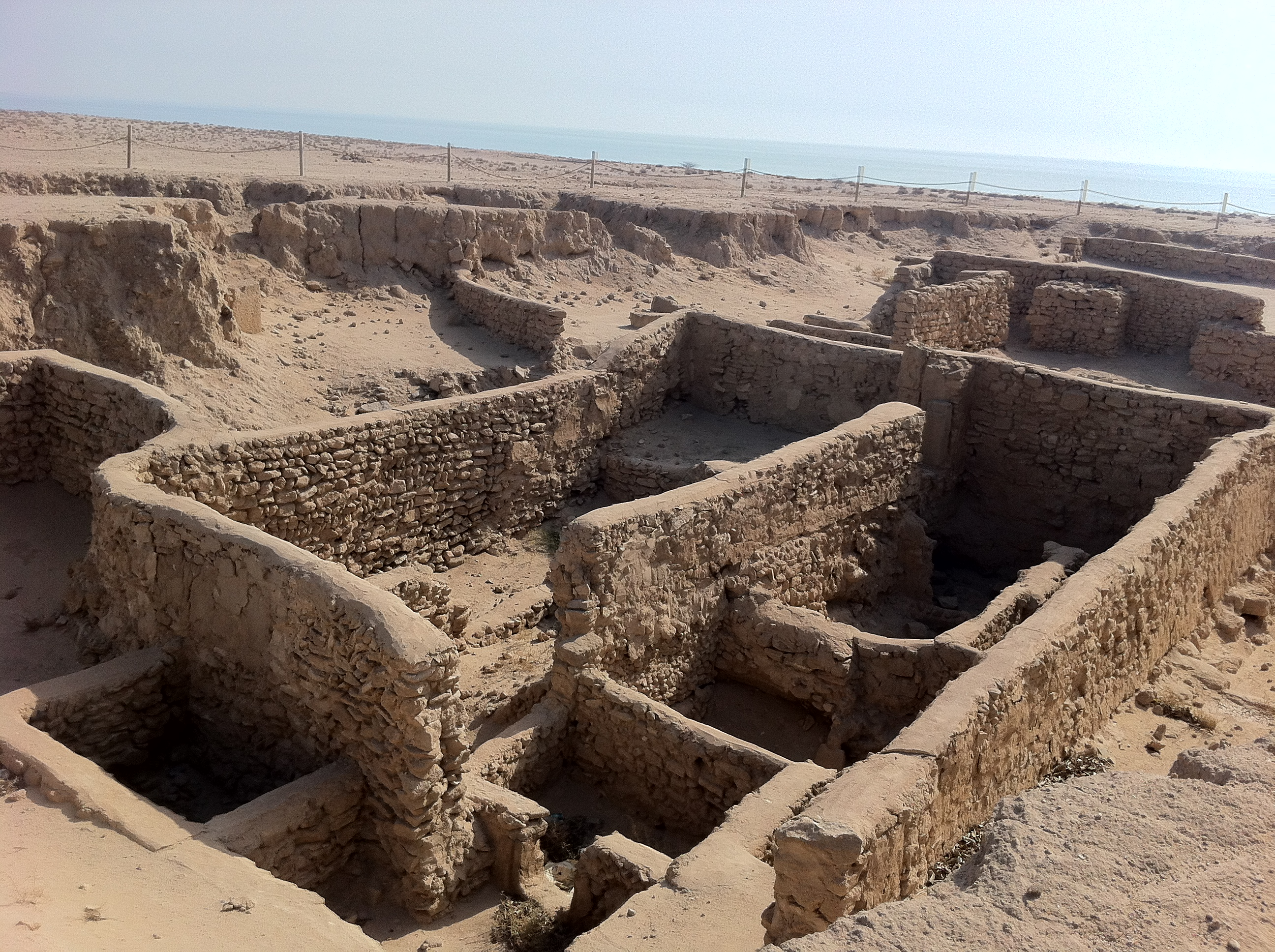
Ruins in Failaka Island

Capital Governorate is one of the six governorates of Kuwait. It is also known as Al Asimah, with "Asimah" meaning "capital" in Arabic. Along with Hawalli and Ahmadi, it was one of the three governorates established in 1962 when Kuwait was divided into governorates. The governorate includes parts of Kuwait City, the capital of Kuwait. It hosts the seat of the national government and key administrative buildings. It includes several islands, including the Failaka Island, and their territorial sea waters. Failaka Island is a 14 km (8.7 mi) long and 6 km (3.7 mi) wide island situated in the Kuwait Bay to the west of the mouth of the Shatt al-Arab river.

The governorate is situated in the Arabian Gulf and is bordered by the governorates of Hawalli to the east, Farwaniya to the south, and Jahra to the west. It occupies a land area of 175 km^{2} (68 sq mi), and is sub-divided into 37 areas:Abdulla Al-Salem, Bnaid Al-Qar, Daiya, Dasma, Dasman, Doha, Doha Port, Faiha, Granada, Jibla, Kaifan, Khaldiya, Mansouriya, Mirqab, Muaskarat al Mubarakiyah, Nuzha, North West Sulaibikhat, Qadsiya, Qortuba, Rawda, Sharq, Shamiya, Shuwaikh, Shuwaikh Health, Shuwaikh Industrial 1, 2 & 3, Shuwaikh Port, Shuwaikh Educational, Sulaibikhat, Surra, Umm an Namil Island, and Yarmouk.

The areas of Al Asimah Governorate

== Demographics ==
According to the 2021 census, the Capital Governorate had a population of 574,839, comprising 311,461 males and 263,378 females. About 469,625 were aged 15 and above, of which 250,693 were married, 191,177 had never married, 17,677 were divorced and 7,900 were widowed.

Kuwaiti citizens numbered 283,579, representing approximately 49.3% of the population, while non-Kuwaiti residents numbered 291,260, accounting for approximately 50.7%. The Kuwaiti population consisted of 138,639 males and 144,940 females, while the non-Kuwaiti population included 172,822 males and 118,438 females. Of the non-Kuwaiti residents, Gulf Cooperation Council countries constituted the largest grouping, with 294,383 people, followed by other Asian countries (excluding Arab countries) with 202,954 and other Arab countries with 67,568. The remaining population included 5,750 from sub-Saharan Africa, 1,924 from Europe, 1,887 from North America, 203 from South America, and 170 from Oceania.

== Economy ==
The Capital Governorate had 37,396 registered establishments. Of the population aged 15 years and above, 330,078 were employed. The Shuwaikh Industrial Area, spread over 20 km^{2} (7.7 sq mi), is the first industrial area established in Kuwait. It is the largest non-oil related industry and warehousing area in the country. The Shuwaikh Port, located in the Shuwaikh Industrial Area, is Kuwait's principal commercial port. Operated by the Kuwait Ports Authority since 1977, the port covers approximately 4.4 million square metres and has 21 berths. In 2024, it handled 3,230,749 tonnes of general cargo and 613,093 twenty-foot equivalent units of containers.
