= Farwaniya Governorate =

Governorate of Kuwait

Farwaniya Governorate محافظة الفروانية
- Governorate
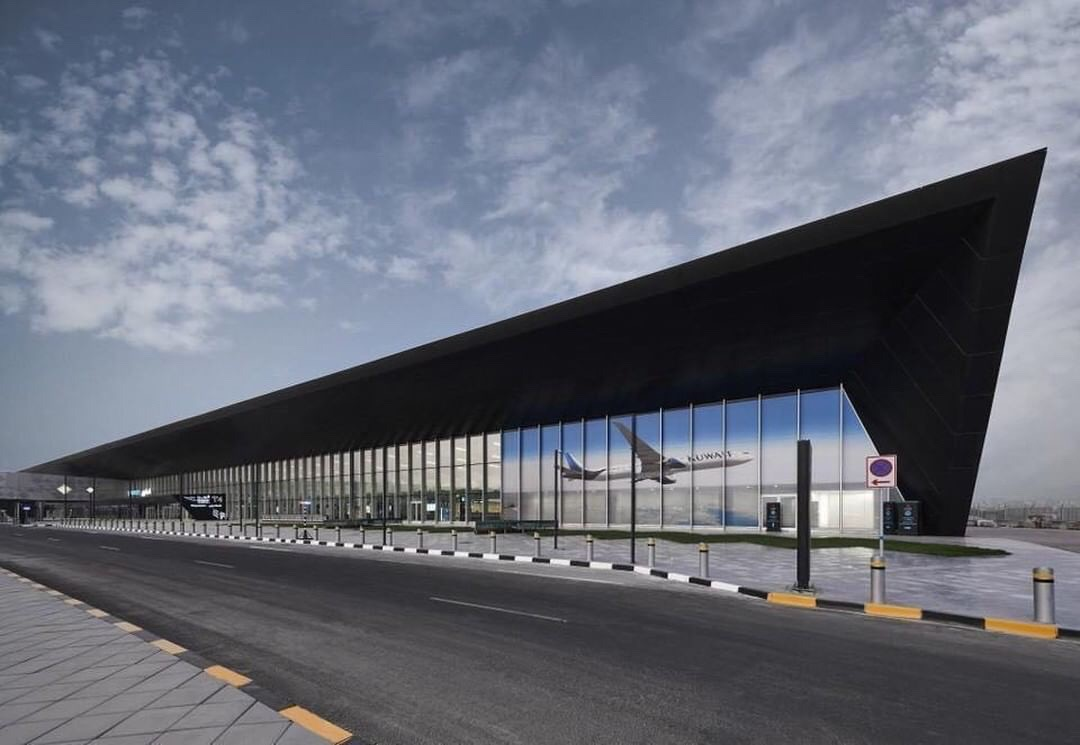
- Kuwait International Airport in Farwaniya Governorate

- Map of Kuwait with Al Farwaniyah highlighted
- Coordinates (Al Farwaniyah): 29.277°N 47.959°E
- Country: Kuwait
- Established: 1988
- Areas: 20

Area
  - Total: 204 km^{2} (79 sq mi)

Population (2021)
  - Total: 1,109,819
  - Density: 5,440/km^{2} (14,100/sq mi)
- Time zone: UTC+03 (EAT)
- ISO 3166 code: KW-FA

Farwaniya Governorate (Arabic: محافظة الفروانية Muḥāfaẓat al-Farwānīyah) is one of the six governorates of Kuwait. Established in 1988, it is the country's only landlocked governorate. The governorate covers an area of approximately 204 km^{2} (79 sq mi) and is subdivided into 20 areas. According to the 2021 census, it had a population of 1,109,819, making it the most populous governorate. It hosts the Kuwait International Airport and Kuwait University.

== Geography ==
Farwaniya Governorate is one of the six governorates of Kuwait. It was established in 1988 as the fifth governorate of Kuwait. It is the only landlocked governorate in Kuwait. It is bordered by the governorates of Asimah (Capital) to the north, Hawalli and Mubarak Al-Kabeer to the east, Ahmadi to the south, and Jahra to the west. It occupies a land area of 204 km^{2} (79 sq mi), and is subdivided into 20 areas: Andalous, Al-Riggae, Al-Rai, Khaitan, Ishbiliya, Al-Dajeej, Airport District, Jleeb Al-Shuyoukh, Ferdous, Ardiya, Ardiya Craft, Ardiya Stores, Ardiya Government (Jaber Sports City), Rehab, Rabiya, Omariya, Farwaniya, Abdullah Al-Mubarak, Camel and Horse Race, and Sabah Al-Nasser.

== Demographics and housing ==
According to the 2021 census, Farwaniya Governorate had a population of 1,109,819, comprising 776,303 males and 333,516 females. It is the most populated governorate in Kuwait. Majority of the population live in high-rise residential buildings located within or near major commercial and business districts in densely populated urban districts. About 928,378 were aged 15 and above, of which 513,714 were married, 381,663 had never married, 18,212 were divorced and 7,582 were widowed.

The govenorate has a substantial expatriate population. Kuwaiti citizens numbered 243,912, representing approximately 22% of the population, while non-Kuwaiti residents numbered 865,907, accounting for approximately 78%. The Kuwaiti population consisted of 118,602 males and 125,310 females, while the non-Kuwaiti population included 657,701 males and 208,206 females. Of the population by nationality group, Gulf Cooperation Council countries constituted a grouping of 266,011 people, followed by other Arab countries with 347,293 and Asian countries with 487,084. The remaining population included 7,478 from sub-Saharan Africa, 846 from Europe, 845 from North America, 170 from South America, and 92 from Oceania.

== Economy ==
Farwaniya Governorate had 26,027 registered establishments, of which 25,669 were in the private sector. Wholesale and retail trade accounted for the largest number of establishments, with 10,400, followed by manufacturing industries with 2,603, and accommodation and food services with 2,403. Of the population aged 15 years and above, 740,593 were employed. Wholesale and retail trade was the largest employment category, accounting for 156,285 people, followed by construction with 150,584 and other service activities with 101,715.

The govenorate hosts the Kuwait International Airport and Kuwait University. The Al-Rai area is home to The Avenues, Kuwait's largest mall. The Ardiya Industrial Zone, dedicated to handicrafts, is located in the governorate
