= Governorates of Kuwait =

Top-level administrative divisions

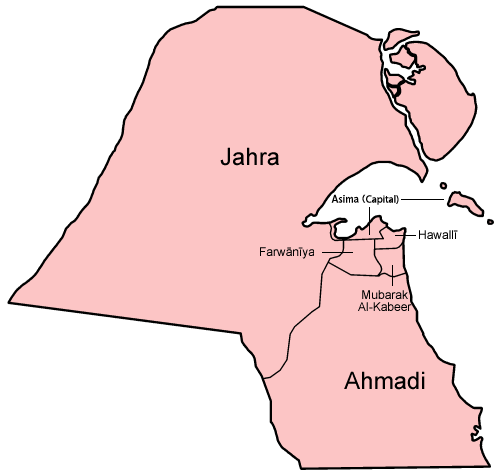
- Category: Governorate
- Location: State of Kuwait
- Number: 6 Governorates (as of 27 November 1999)
- Populations: Mubarak Al-Kabeer Governorate - 254,999 (lowest); Farwaniya Governorate - 1,169,312 (highest)
- Areas: Hawalli Governorate - 85 km^{2} (33 sq mi) (smallest); Jahra Governorate - 11,230 km^{2} (4,340 sq mi) km² (largest)
- Government: Government of Kuwait
- Subdivisions: Areas of Kuwait

Kuwait is divided into 6 governorates (muhafazah). The governorates are further subdivided into areas. Each governorate is headed by a Governor appointed by a ministerial decree for a period of 4 years which can be renewed upon the proposal of the Prime Minister.

== History ==
The beginning of the formation of governorates in the State of Kuwait started in 1962 with the Emiri decree No. 6 which divided the Kuwait into three governorates i.e. Asimah Governorate, Hawalli Governorate and Ahmadi Governorate. Later, Jahra Governorate, Farwaniya Governorate and Mubarak Al-Kabeer Governorate were formed in three periods of time: 1979, 1988 and 1999 respectively.

== Governorates ==
Governorate	ISO 3166-2:KW	Formation	Population	Area (km^{2})	Notes
Ahmadi Governorate	KW-AH	1962	959,009	5,120	It was named after Sheikh Ahmad Al-Jaber Al-Sabah, 10th ruler of Kuwait.
Asimah Governorate	KW-KU	1962	568,567	175	It houses most of Kuwait's financial and business centres such as the Kuwait Stock Exchange.
Farwaniya Governorate	KW-FA	1988	1,169,312	204	It is the most populated governorate.
Hawalli Governorate	KW-HA	1962	939,792	85	It is the smallest and most densely populated governorate.
Jahra Governorate	KW-JA	1979	540,910	11,230	It is the largest governorate and contains the agricultural area.
Mubarak Al-Kabeer Governorate	KW-MU	1999	254,999	104	The newest governorate of Kuwait, founded in 1999 and the least populated governorate in Kuwait.

== See also ==
- Demographics of Kuwait
- Areas of Kuwait
- ISO 3166-2:KW
