= Tourism in Kuwait =

Tourism in Kuwait is an important component of the country's economy, and includes both domestic and international tourism. In 2018, the tourist industry accounted for over 1.069 billion dinars of country's GDP. The tourist industry in Kuwait is considered the most successful among the Gulf nations, employing more than 516,000 people in 2018.

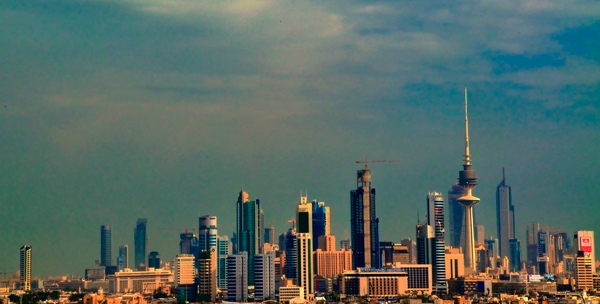
Skyline of Kuwait City

The Kuwait Towers

The country's major tourist attractions include Kuwait Towers in Kuwait City, Al Hamra Tower, which is currently the tallest curved skyscraper in the world, Sabah Al-Ahmad Sea City, a marine city that is located south of Ahmadi, and the Grand Mosque Of Kuwait, the largest mosque in Kuwait, which is located in Kuwait City. The Amiri Diwan recently inaugurated the new Kuwait National Cultural District (KNCD), which comprises Sheikh Abdullah Al Salem Cultural Centre, Sheikh Jaber Al Ahmad Cultural Centre, Al Shaheed Park, and Al Salam Palace. These destinations recently has become famous tourist attractions, luring more tourists onto the region. And with a capital cost of more than US$1 billion, this project is said to be one of the largest cultural investments in the world.

== History ==
While inbound tourism in Kuwait may be sluggish, the same cannot be said for outbound tourism, which has been thriving for years, arguably even more so since the invasion of Kuwait in 1990. The seven-month occupation of Kuwait and its subsequent aftermath exposed a large segment of Kuwaiti society to the countries in the surrounding region that offered refuge to the 'wealthy evacuees' for the first time.

Following the Gulf War, Kuwait embarked on a journey of infrastructural development. This led to the reconstruction of numerous tourist attractions, including the Al Qurain Martyrs Museum, established to honor the Kuwaiti soldiers who were martyred in the Gulf War. The invasion of Kuwait marked a turning point for the country, transforming it into a developed state and paving the way for the growth of its tourism industry. Today, the State of Kuwait stands as a robust tourist destination, attracting expatriates and visitors from around the world.

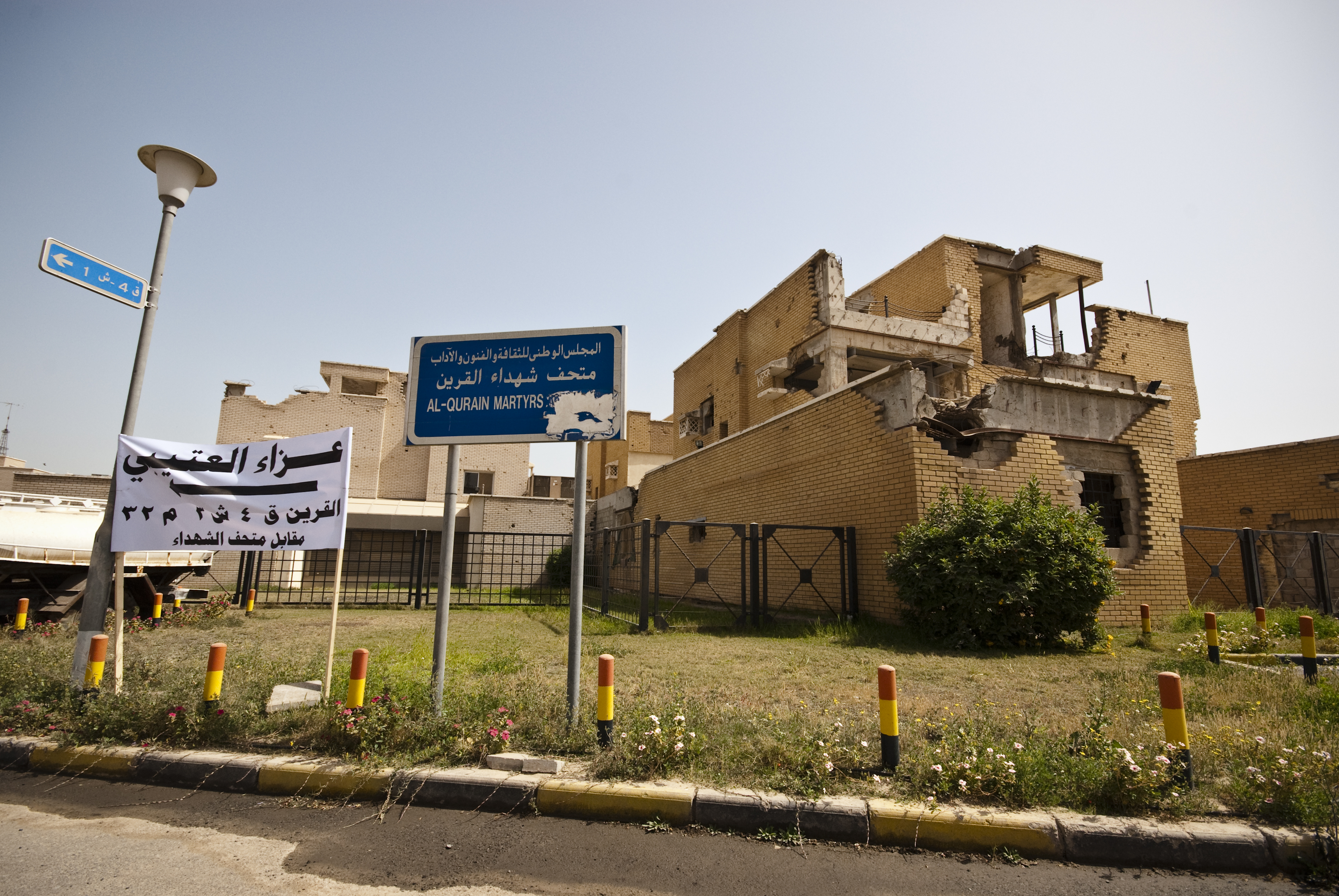
Al Qurain Martyrs Museum

== Attractions ==
Kuwait, a country in the process of development, is currently focusing on enhancing its attractions. This includes their museums, islands, and ocean activities such as water sports, yachting, and diving. Despite being an emerging country, Kuwait is increasingly being recognized for its significant attractions. These landmarks are not only pivotal to Kuwait but are leaving an impact on the region.

=== Museums ===
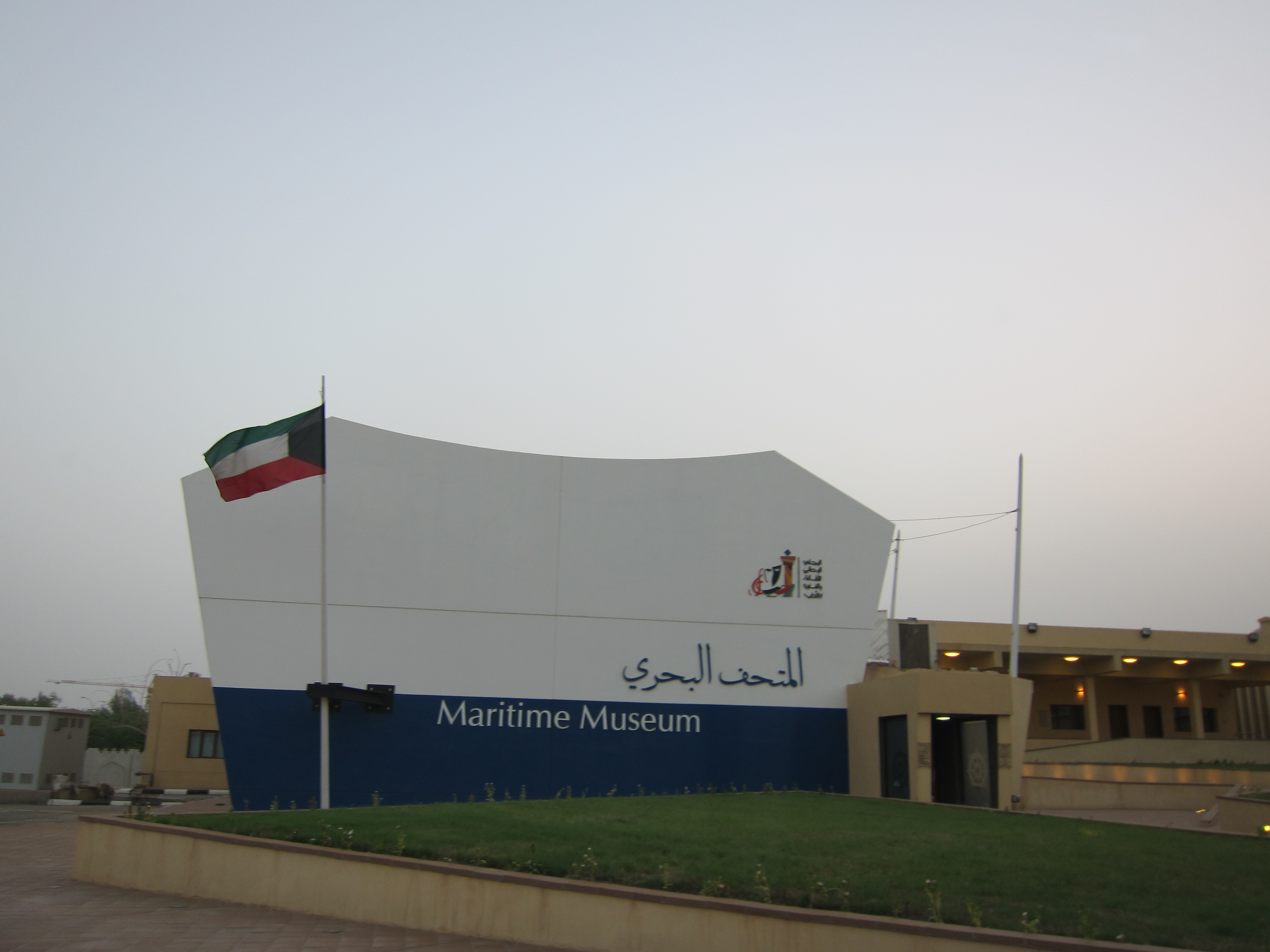
Maritime Museum of Kuwait

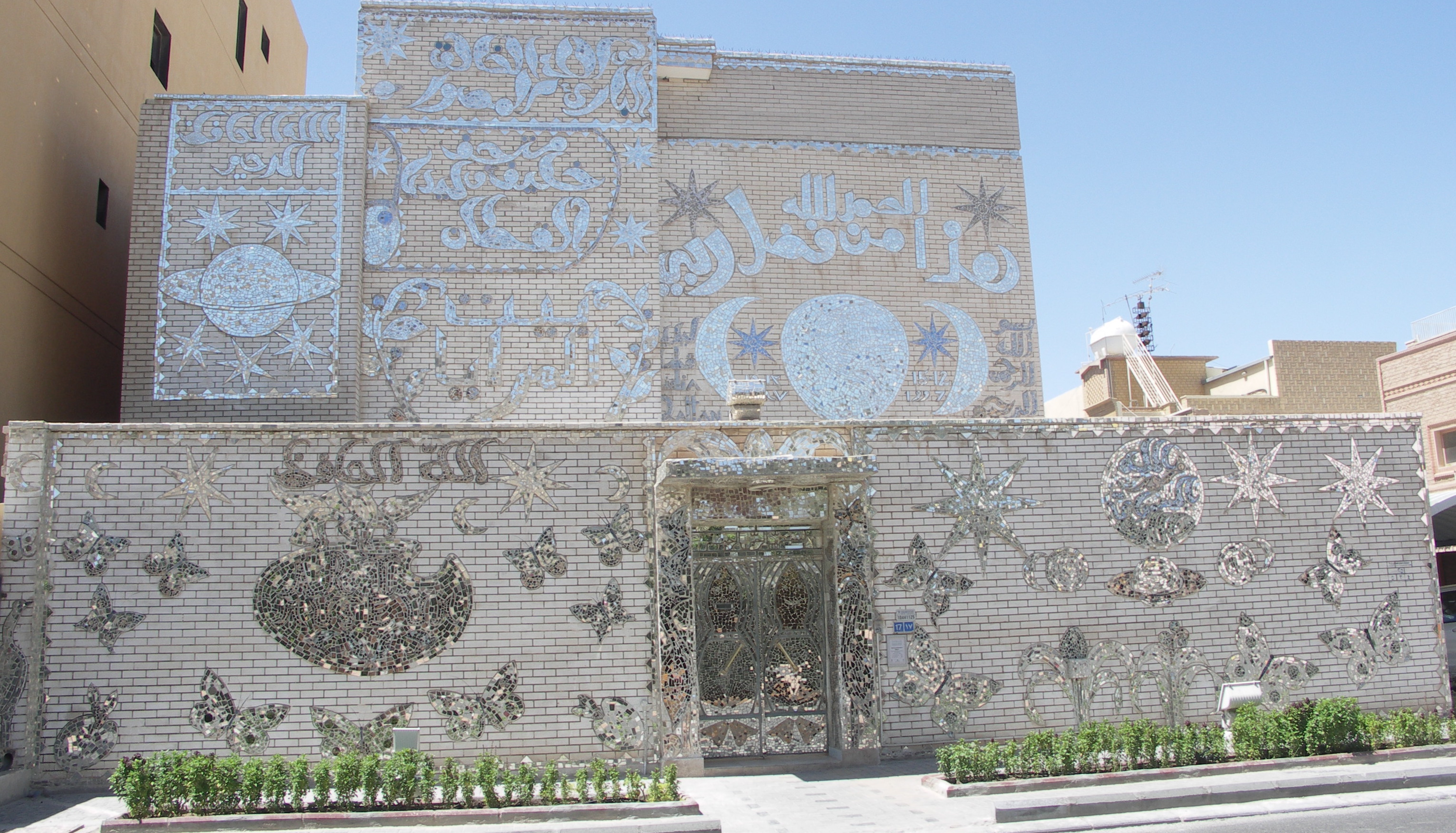
Mirror House

Kuwait has numerous museums, most notably Bait Al-Othman Museum, Maritime Museum, Mirror House and Museum of Modern Art.

=== Malls ===
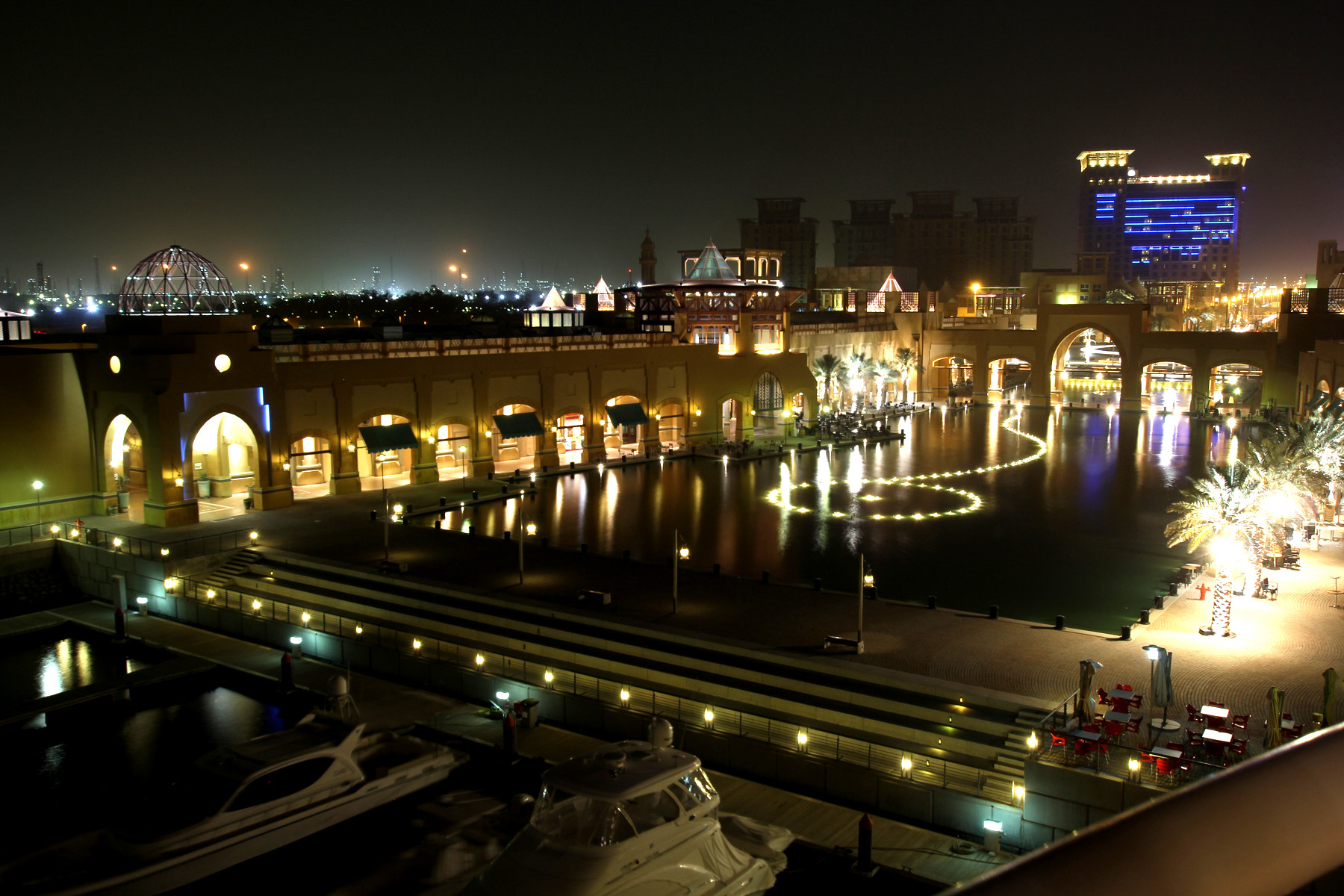
Al Kout Mall view

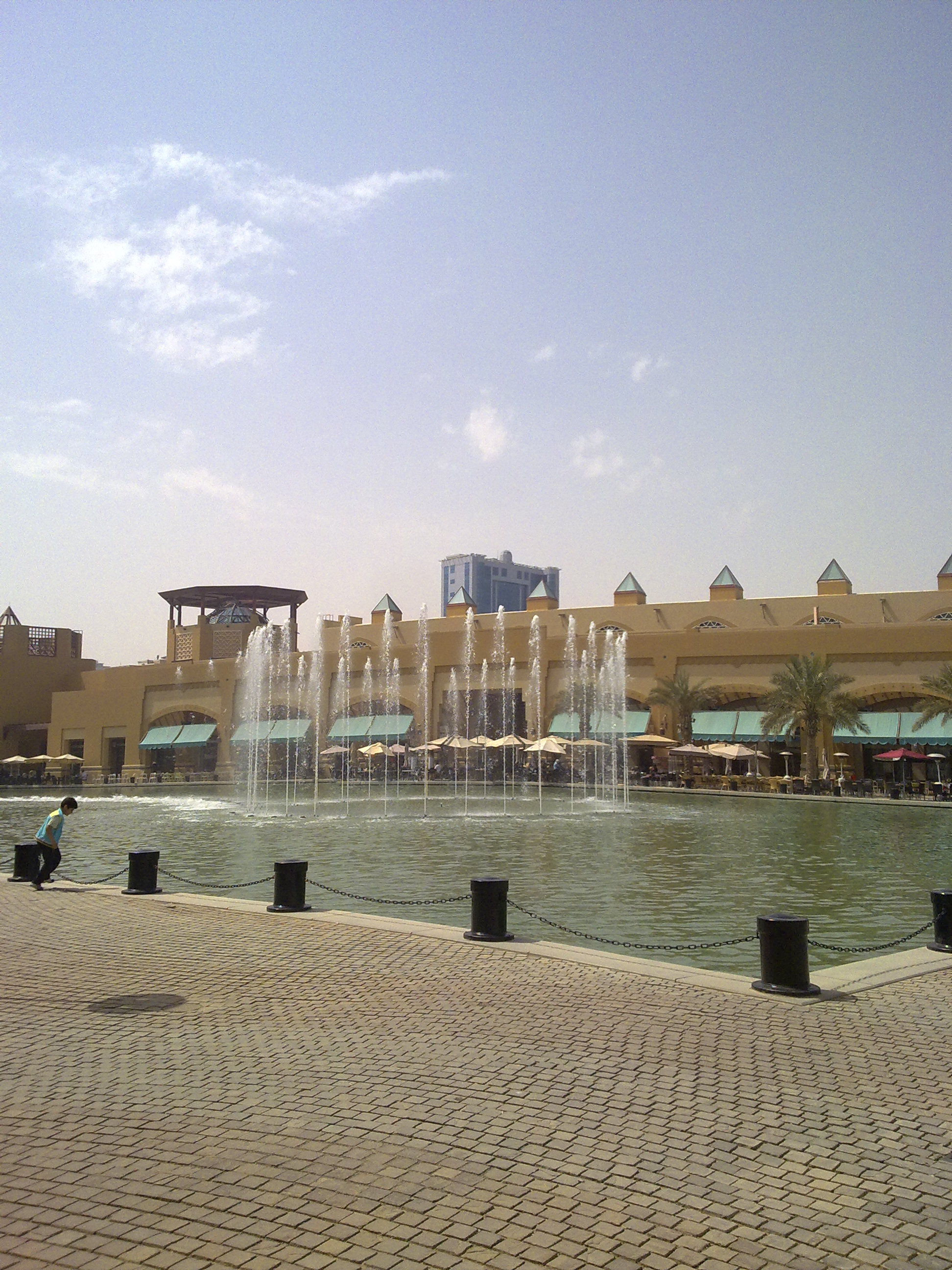
Fountain in Al Kout Mall

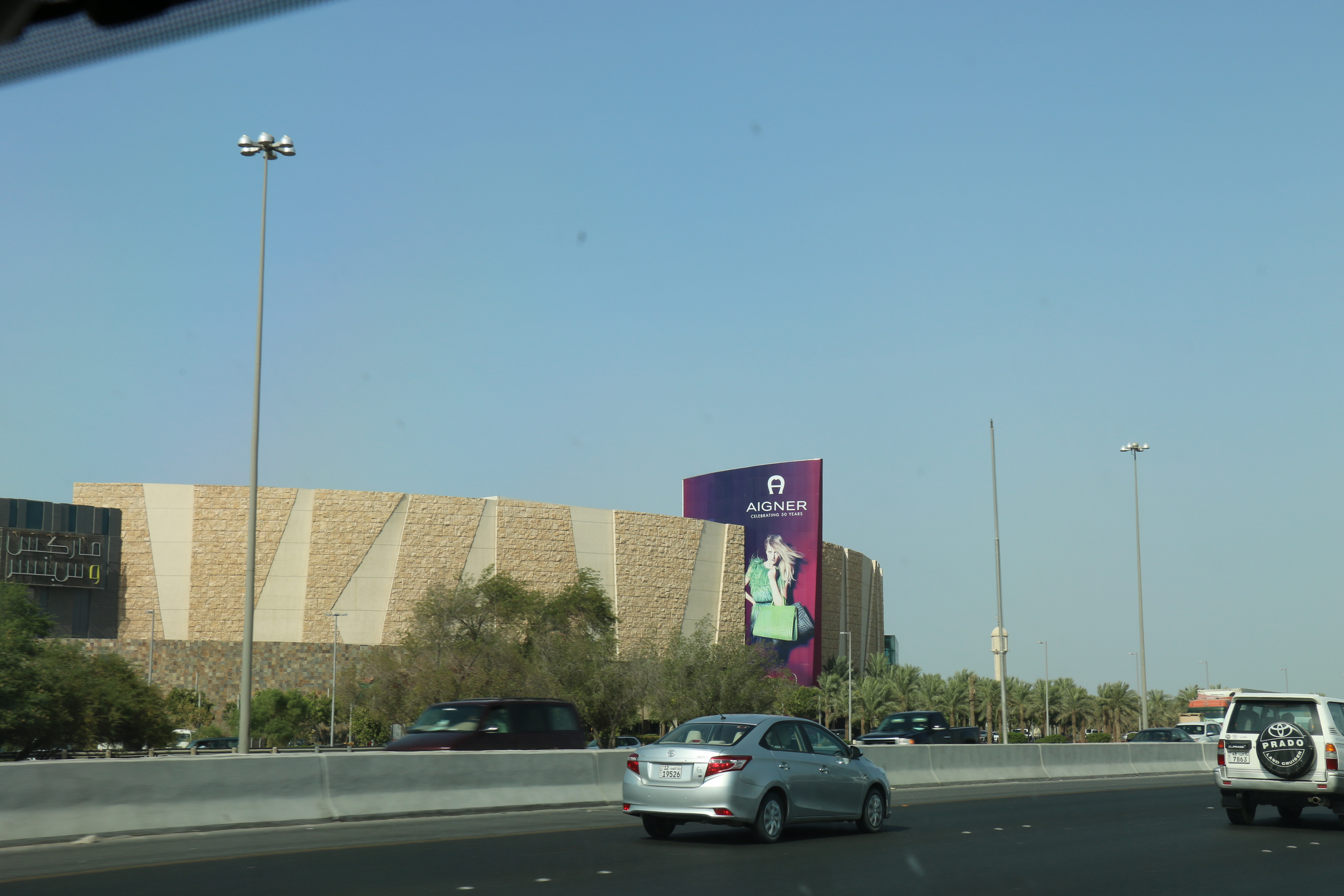
360 mall Exterior view

Kuwait has many famous and large malls. The most notable malls in Kuwait are the Avenues Mall, which is located in Al Rai and is the largest mall in Kuwait, the 360 Mall located in Al-Zahra, Al Kout Mall located in Fahaheel, the Assima Mall located in Kuwait City, and the Marina Mall located in Salmiya.

=== Island trips ===
One-day trips by boat to one of Kuwait's islands, such as Kubbar and Failaka, are available, including activities such as picnicking and swimming.

== Tourist destinations ==
=== Kuwait City ===
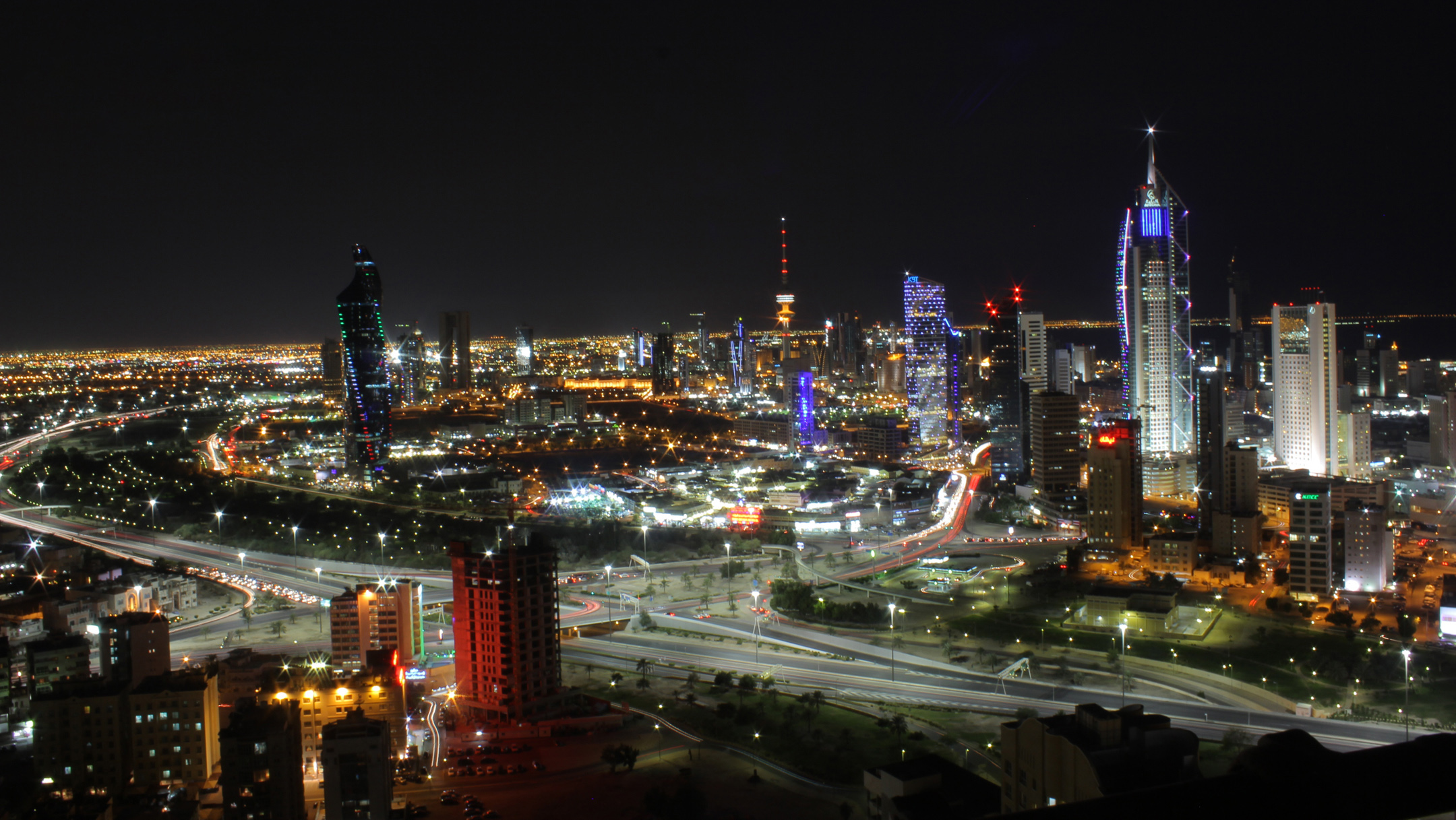
Skyline of Kuwait City, the largest city in the State of Kuwait

Kuwait City is the capital of the Kuwait, and is the most popular tourist destination in the country. Located at the heart of the country on the south shore of Kuwait Bay on the Persian Gulf, it is the political, cultural and economical centre of the emirate, containing Kuwait's Seif Palace, most of towers are located in this place, such as Kuwait Towers, Al Hamra Tower, Liberation Tower, etc. Tourist destinations also incluide government offices, the headquarters of most Kuwaiti corporations and banks, and beaches. The Sheikh Jaber Al-Ahmad Cultural Centre is the largest cultural center and opera house in both Kuwait and Middle East. The cultural centre is part of the Kuwait National Cultural District.

=== Salmiya ===
The city of Salmiya hosts numerous museums, mosques, aquariums, Kuwait Scientific Center, IMAX movie theaters, football stadium, medical centers, a Roman Catholic Chapel, a well-equipped park beside the 5th Ring Road for tourists. Notable malls include the Salmiya Souq Mega-mall which was the first mall in the nation, Marina Mall and Marina Beach in the Marina World shopping and entertainment district. The museum of Sheikh Abdullah Al-Salem Cultural Centre is a cultural complex located in Salmiya, this cultural complex includes museums like Science, Space, Arts, etc. The Sheikh Abdullah Al-Salem Cultural Centre was inaugurated in early 2018, it was the world's largest single-delivery museum project.

=== Sabah Al-Ahmad Sea City ===
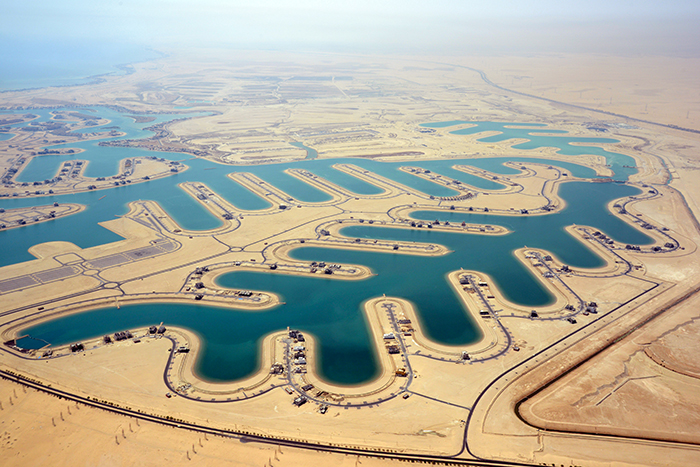
Sabah Al-Ahmad Sea City, A marine city located south of Ahmadi

Sabah Al Ahmad Sea City is a city in Ahmadi, Kuwait built with canals forming 200 kilometres (120 mi) of artificial shoreline. The city houses up to 250,000 residents. The city was inaugurated in mid 2016. The artificial islands that make up the area are rather unusual due to them being built by excavating large channels in the deserted land rather than using reclaimed land. The Sea City is also to be found as similar to the Palm Jumeirah Islands, which are located in the city of Dubai. There is also a mall and marina.

=== Jahra ===
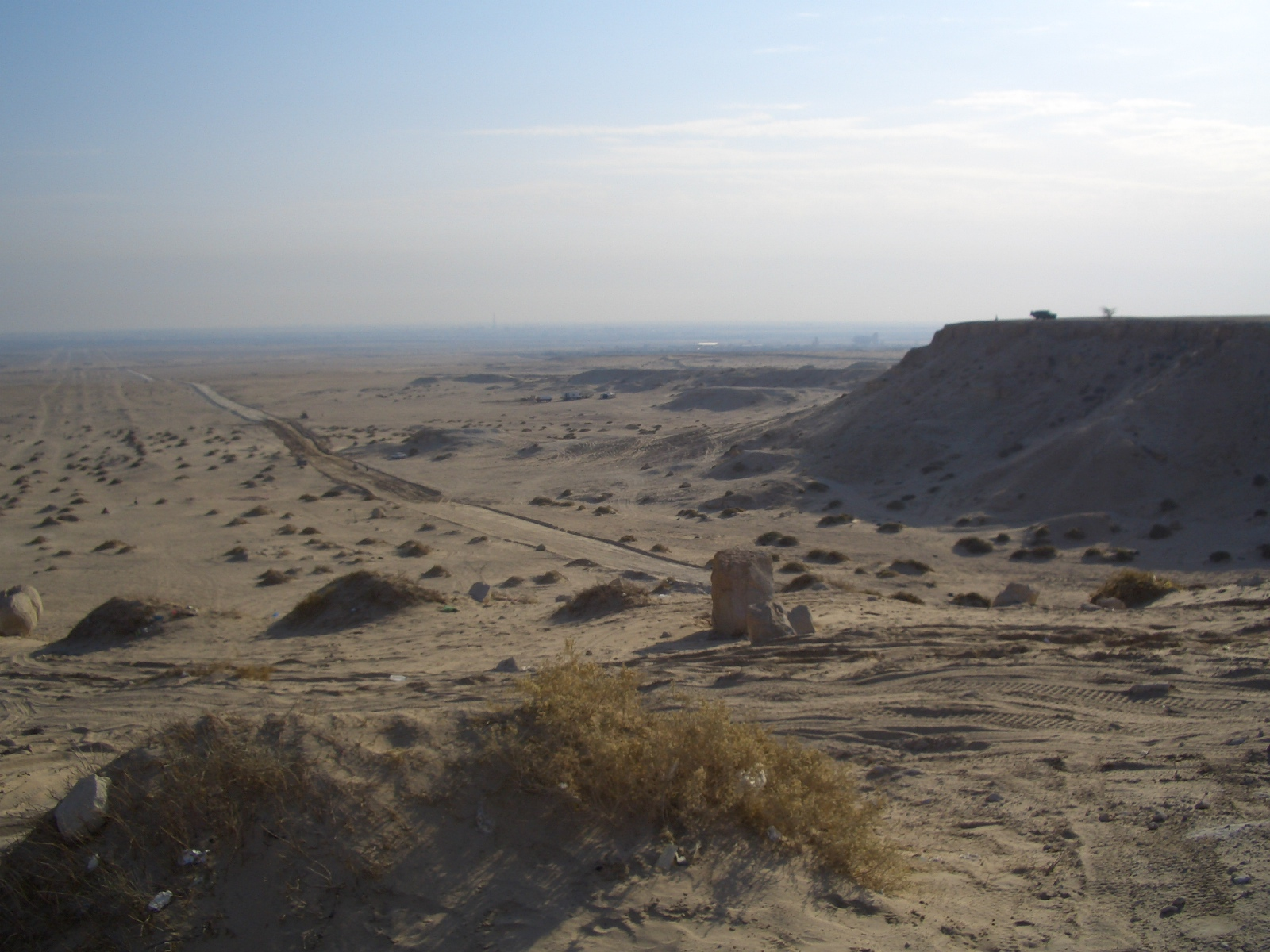
View from Mutla Ridge

Jahra is a town and city located 32 kilometres (20 mi) west of the centre of Kuwait City in Kuwait. This place has agricultural areas. This city hosts the Red Palace (also known as Kuwaiti Red Fort) and the Sabah Al-Ahmad Nature Reserve, where animals and flowers, inhabit in this reserve. This reserve is also the biggest in the State of Kuwait and the Al Mutla Ridge which is the highest point in Kuwait.

=== Ahmadi ===
Ahmadi is a city which is located about 40 kilometers south of the capital, Kuwait City. Established in the 1940s by the Kuwait Oil Company (KOC) to house its workers, the city's design is characterized by its broad, tree-lined streets and notable green spaces, which distinguish it from the more arid regions of the country. Ahmadi is closely associated with Kuwait's oil industry and is home to KOC Display Centre, which provides an overview of the country's oil history. The city also contains parks, including the Ahmadi Garden, as well as a local stadium that hosts sporting events. Ahmadi is recognized for its quieter, suburban atmosphere in contrast to the more densely populated and urbanized areas of Kuwait.

== Images ==
The Kuwait Towers, Major tourist attraction of Kuwait.

Al Hamra Tower, The tallest curved concrete skyscraper in the world.

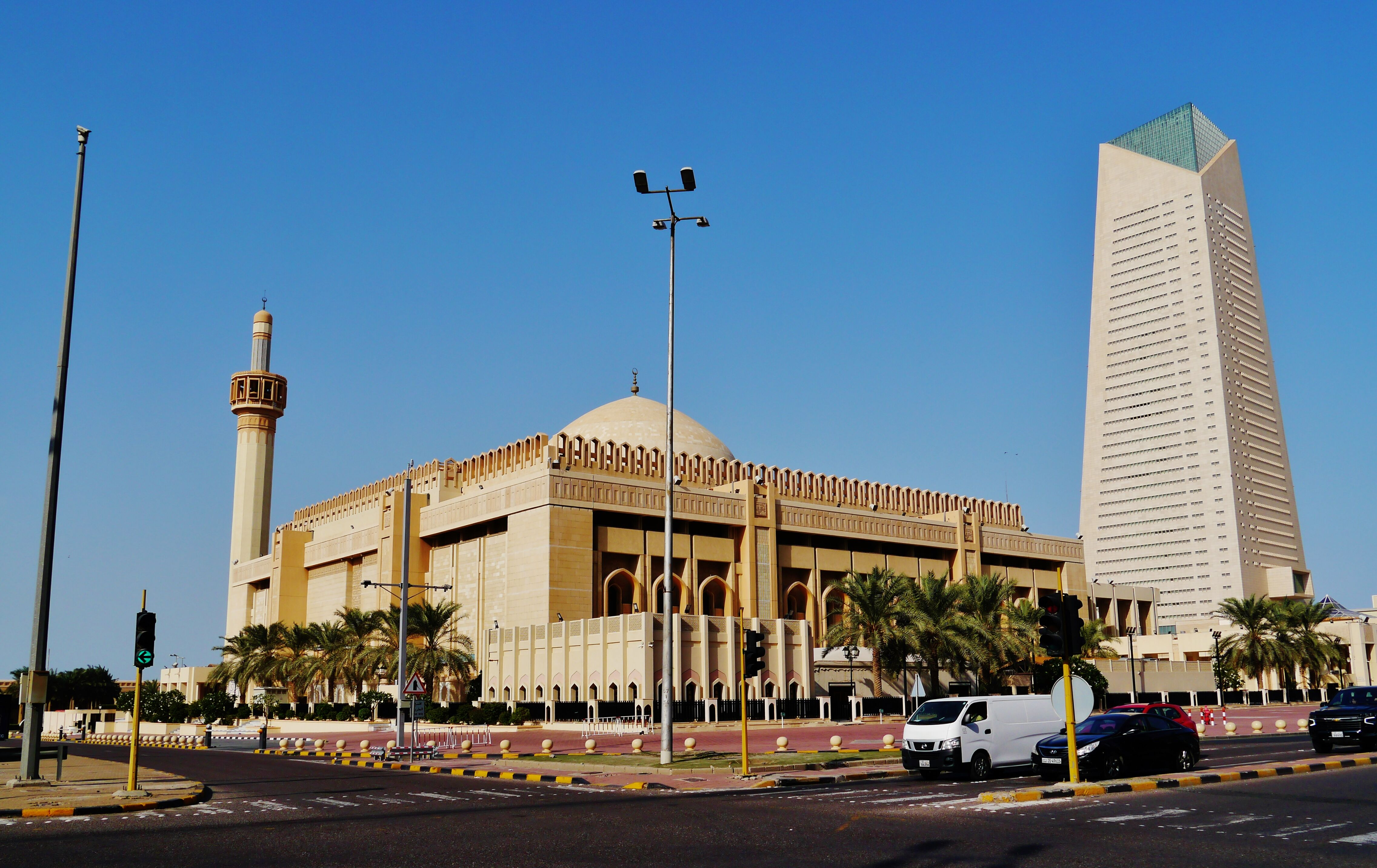
Grand Mosque of Kuwait, the largest mosque in the State of Kuwait.

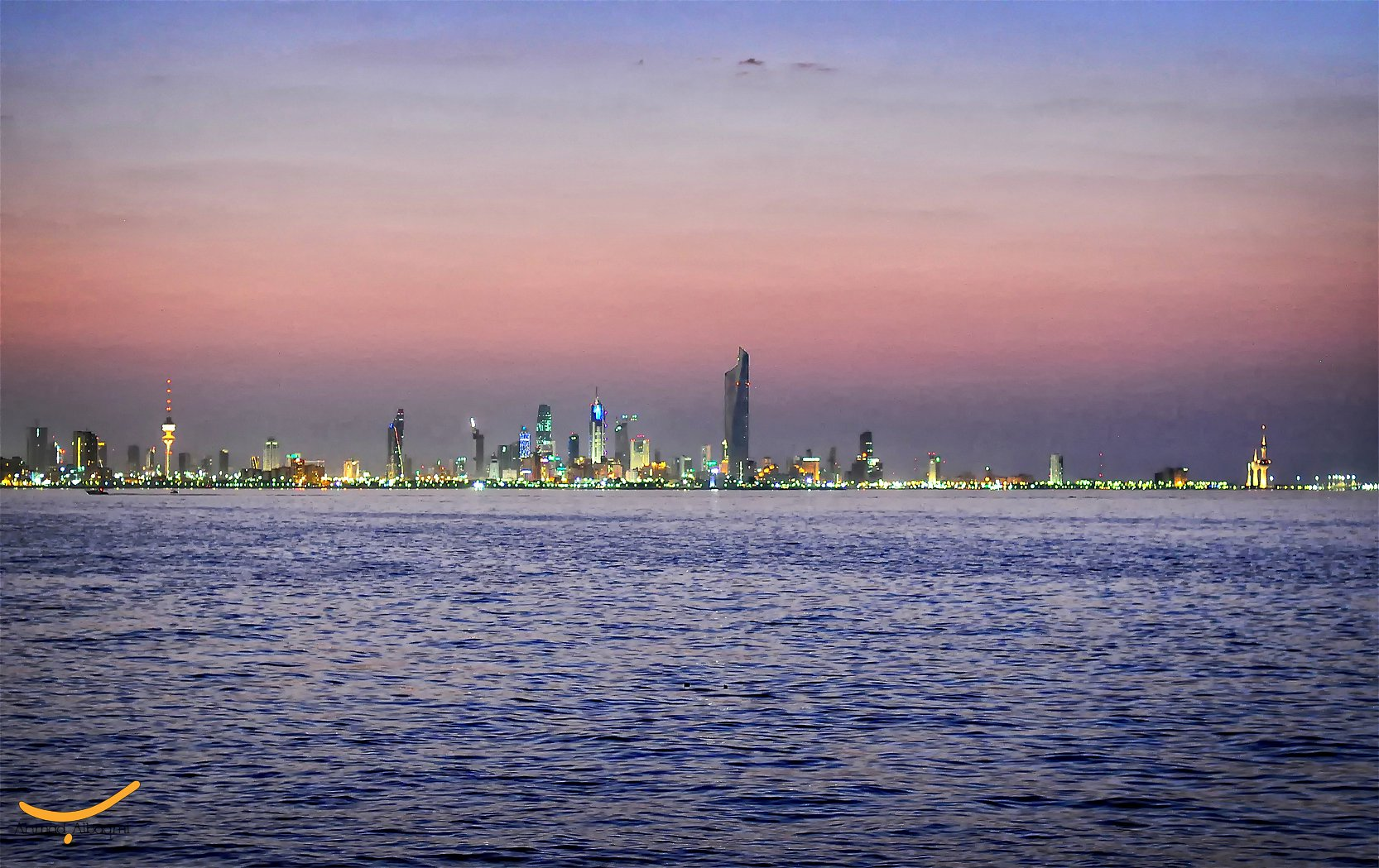
Kuwait City skyline at night.

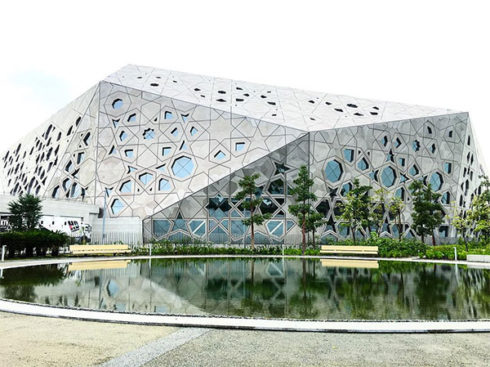
The Sheikh Jaber Al-Ahmad Cultural Centre, the largest cultural complex in both the State of Kuwait and the Middle East.

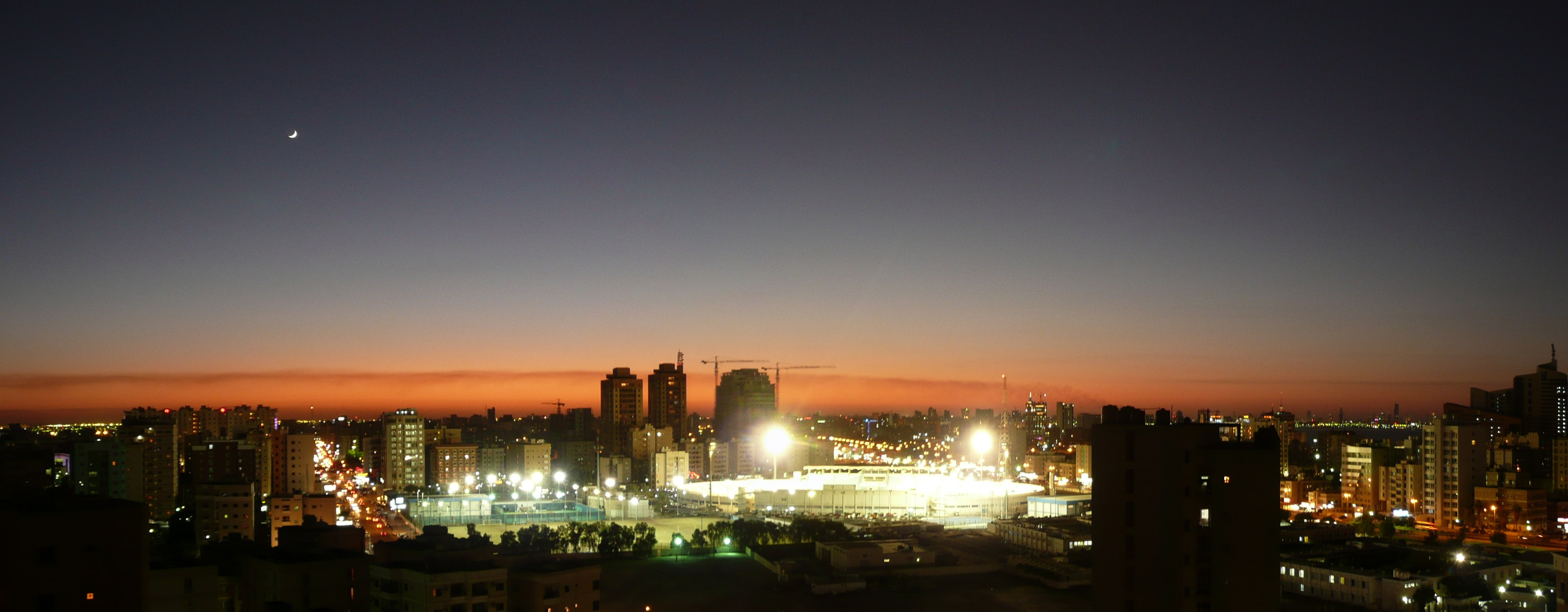
Skyline of Salmiya at night.

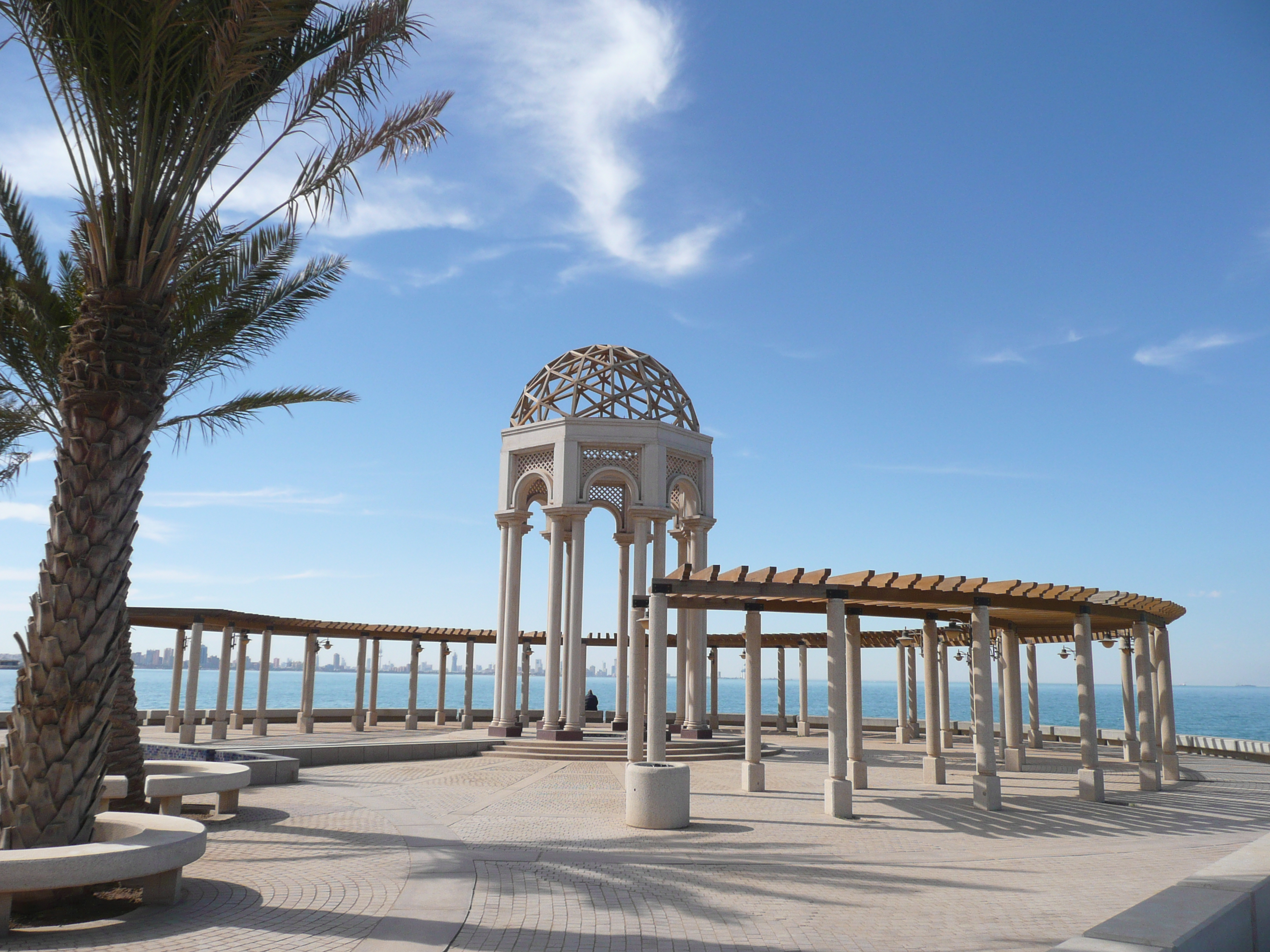
Waterfront in the Marina Beach of Salmiya.

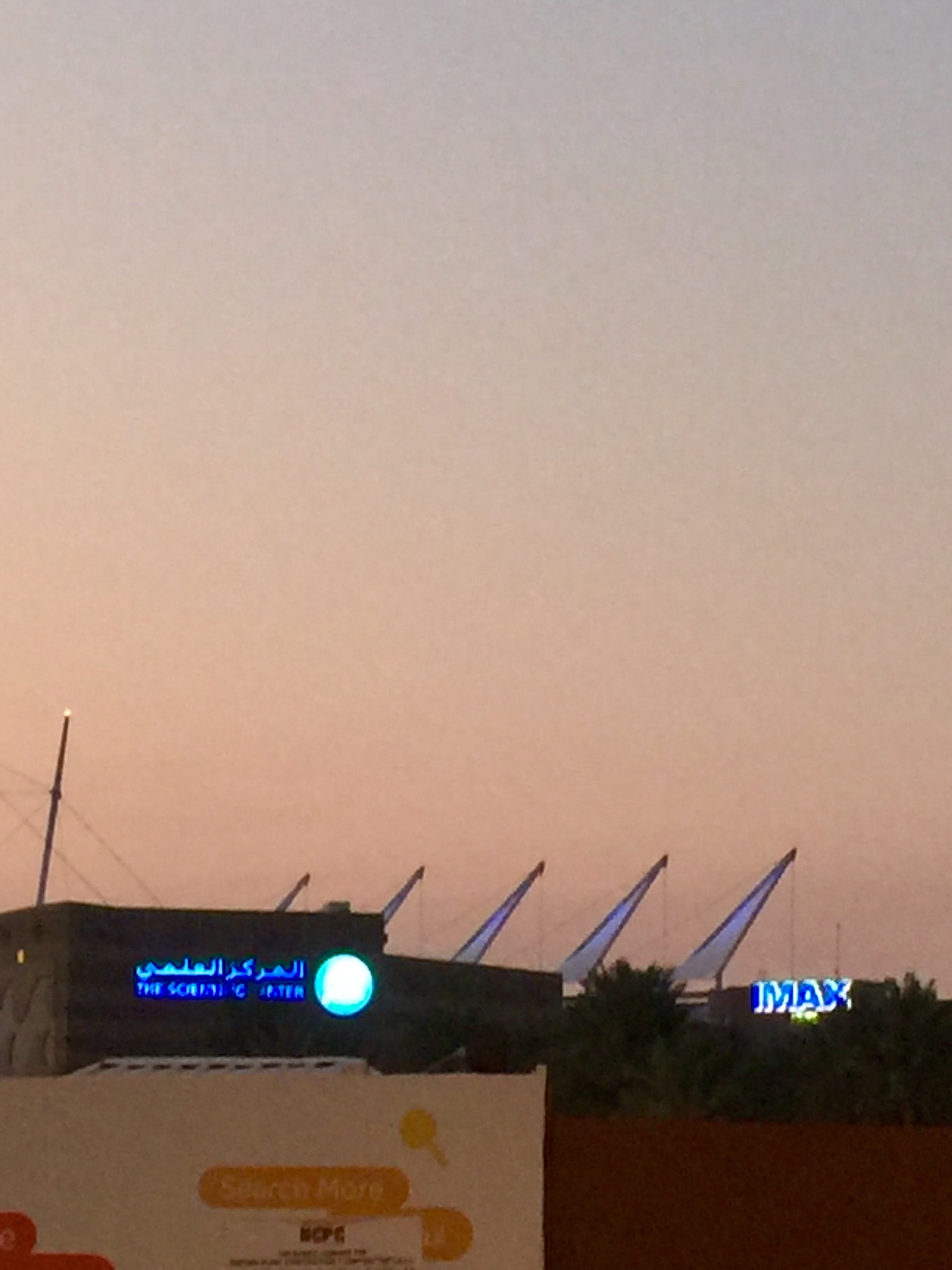
The Scientific Center, located in Salmiya.

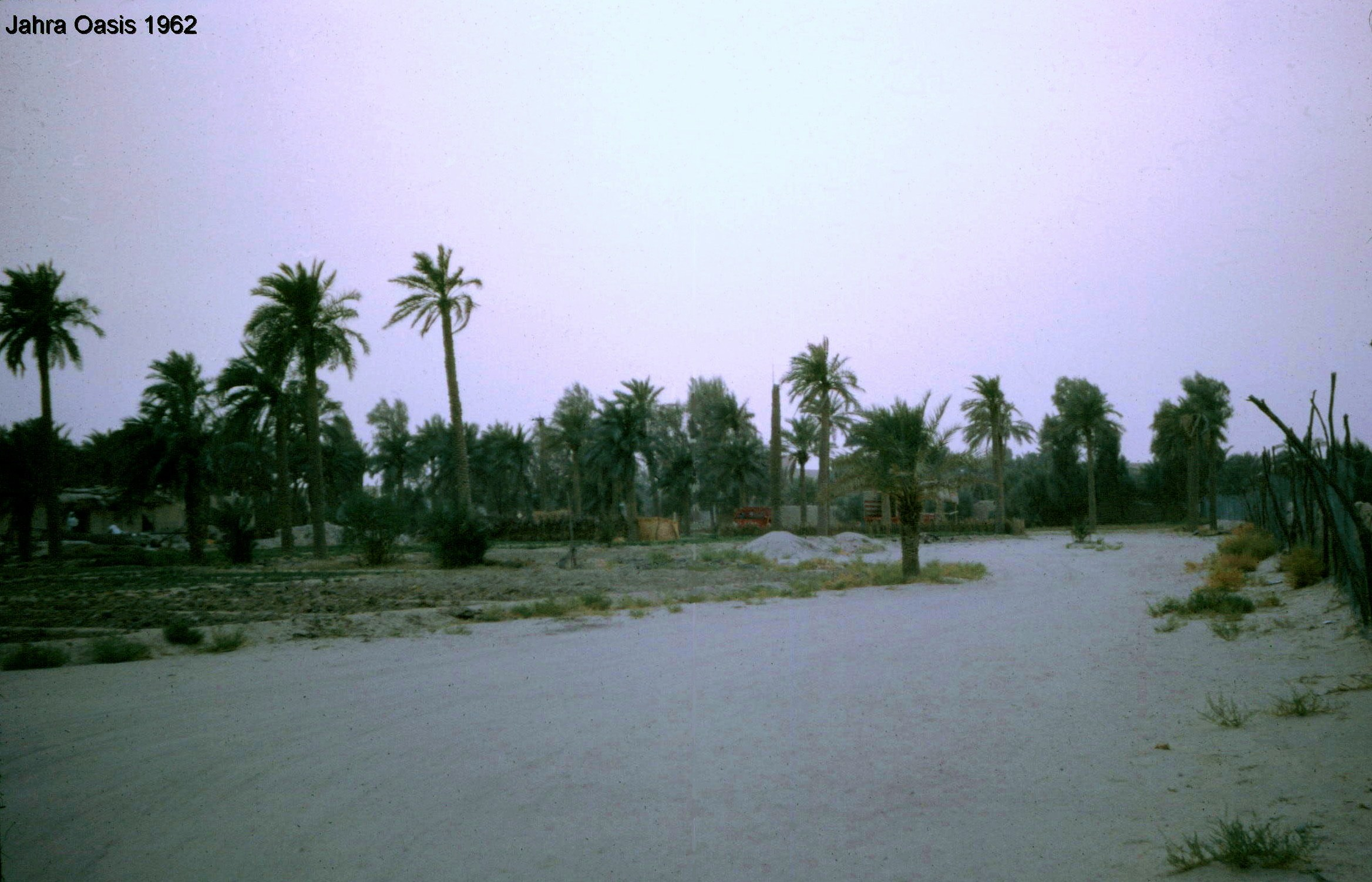
The Oasis of Jahra Nature Reserve

== Tourism statistics ==
=== International visitors ===
Year	Tourist Arrivals
2021	3,000,000
2020	2,200,000
2019	8,600,000
2018	8,500,000
2017	7,100,000
2016	8,000,000

== See also ==
- Visa policy of Kuwait
- List of museums in Kuwait
- Outline of Kuwait
- Index of Kuwait-related articles
