= Art of Kuwait =

The Kuwaiti modern art movement emerged in the 1930s, Kuwait has the oldest modern arts movement in the Arabian Peninsula. Kuwait is home to more than 20 art galleries. In recent years, Kuwait's contemporary art scene has boomed. Kuwait has the second most lively gallery scene in the GCC (after Dubai).

The Amiri Diwan recently inaugurated the new Kuwait National Cultural District (KNCD), which comprises Sheikh Abdullah Al Salem Cultural Centre, Sheikh Jaber Al Ahmad Cultural Centre, Al Shaheed Park, and Al Salam Palace. With a capital cost of more than US$1 billion, the project is one of the largest cultural investments in the world. In November 2016, the Sheikh Jaber Al Ahmad Cultural Centre opened. It is the largest cultural centre in the Middle East. The Kuwait National Cultural District is a member of the Global Cultural Districts Network.

== History ==
Kuwait has the oldest modern arts movement in the Arabian Peninsula. Beginning in 1936, Kuwait was the first Gulf country to grant scholarships in the arts. Ghazi and Najat Sultan launched Kuwait’s first art gallery in 1969 .

The Sultan Gallery was the first professional Arab art gallery in the Persian Gulf region. Khalifa Al-Qattan was the first Kuwaiti artist to hold a solo artist exhibition in Kuwait. He founded a new art theory in the early 1960s known as "circulism". Other notable Kuwaiti artists include Sami Mohammad, Thuraya Al-Baqsami and Suzan Bushnaq.

== Art galleries ==
List of art galleries in Kuwait:

- Dar Al Funoon
- Contemporary Art Platform (CAP)
- Boushahri Gallery
- Sultan Gallery
- Free Art Atelier
- Den Gallery
- The Hub
- Al Mashreq Gallery
- Ghadir Gallery
- Al Othman Gallery
- Dahiya Abdullah Al-Salim Art Gallery
- AM Art & Design Gallery
- Al Adwani Art Gallery
- Visual Therapy Gallery
- The Print Room
- Art Space
- Museum of Modern Art
- Al-Makan
- Masaha 13
- Center of the Arts
- Sadu House
- Dar al-Athar al-Islamiyyah at Yarmouk Cultural Centre
- Dar El Cid
- Manifesto 13
- Promenade Culture Center
- Wejha
- Fann Way Gallery
- Fine Arts Centre, Sheikh Abdullah Al Salem Cultural Centre
