= List of museums in Kuwait =

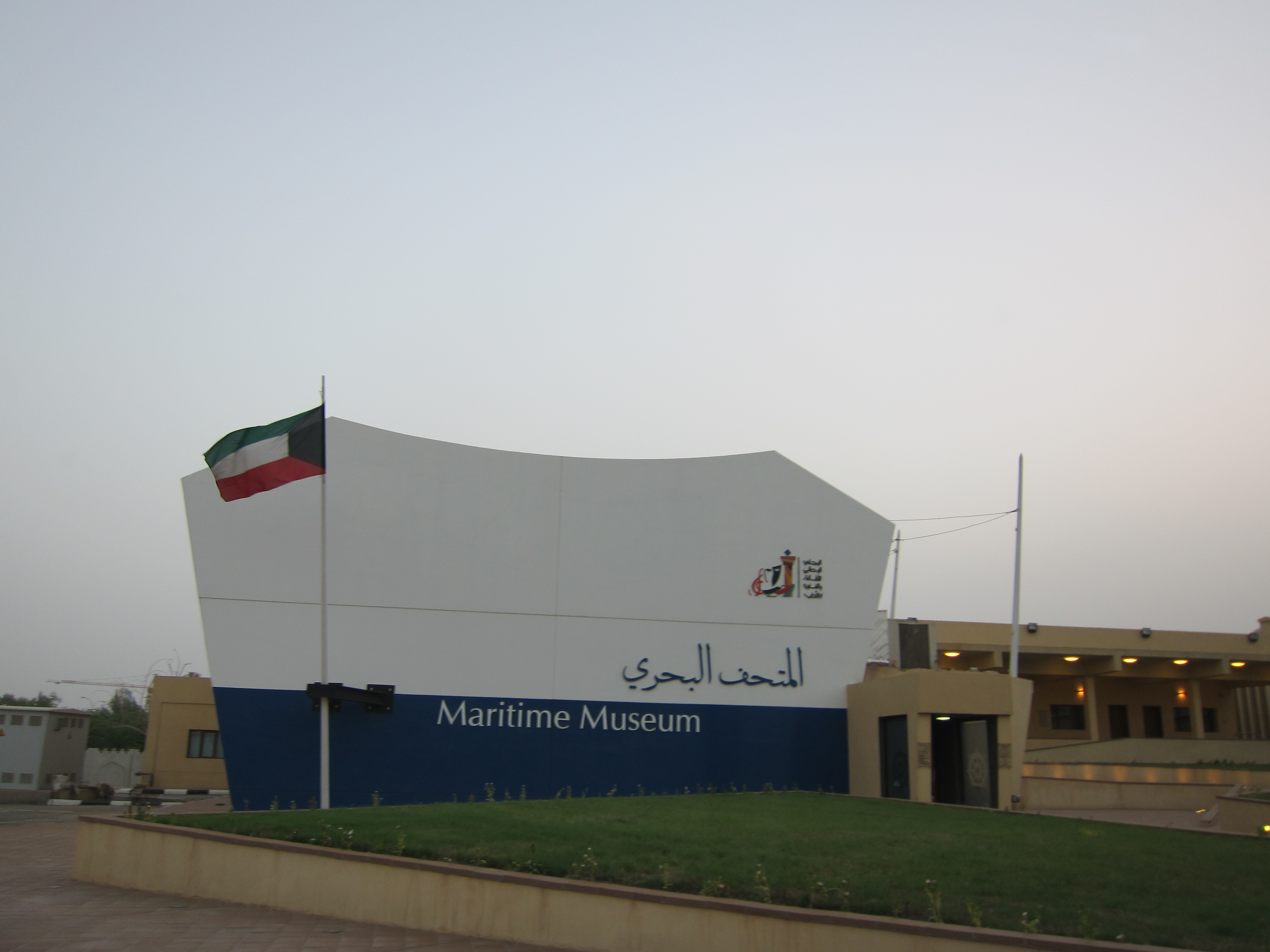
Kuwait Maritime Museum

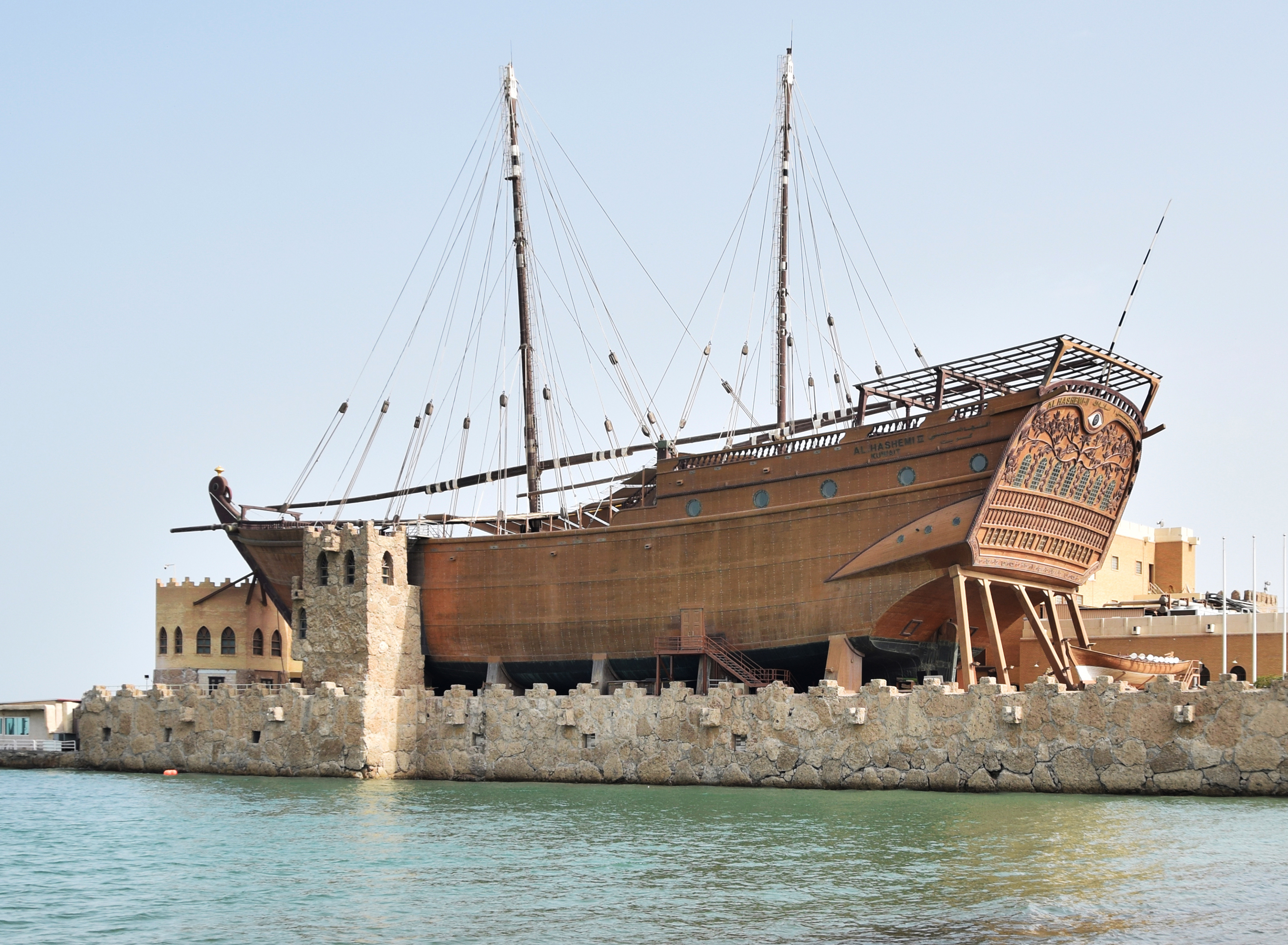
Al-Hashemi-II is the largest dhow ever built.

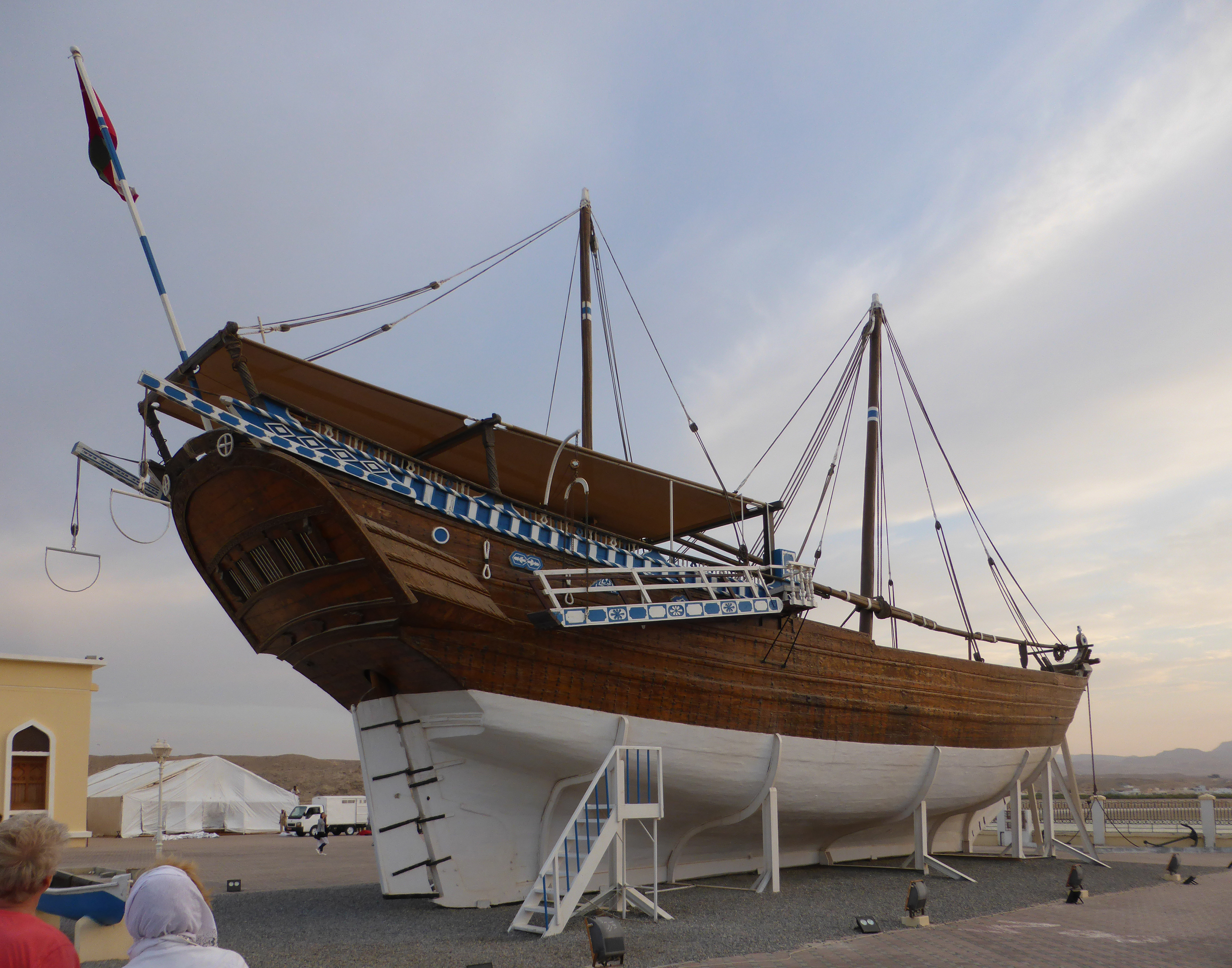
Fateh Al-Khayr is a museum ship in Kuwait.

This is a list of museums in Kuwait:

- Dar al-Athar al-Islamiyyah
- Kuwait National Cultural District
  - Sheikh Abdullah Al Salem Cultural Centre
  - Al Salam Palace
  - Habitat Museum at Al Shaheed Park
  - Remembrance Museum at Al Shaheed Park
- Bait Al-Othman Museum
- Ahmad Al-Jaber Oil and Gas Museum
- Qibla Cultural District
  - Sadu House
  - National Museum of Kuwait
  - Bait al-Bader
- Museum of Modern Art
- Kuwait Maritime Museum
- Tareq Rajab Museum
- Tareq Rajab Museum of Islamic Calligraphy (Dar Jehan)
- Al Qurain Martyr's Museum
- Historical, Vintage, and Classical Cars Museum
- Amricani Cultural Centre
- Dickson House
- Yarmouk Cultural Centre
- House of Mirrors
- Failaka Museum
- Jahra Red Palace Museum
- Municipal Museum
- History of Education Museum (Mubarakiya School)
- Kuwait Scientific Center
- Alaujairy's Astronomical Museum
- Kuwait House of National Works: Memorial Museum
- Kuwait Science and Natural History Museum
- Al-Hashemi Marine Museum
- Fateh Al-Khayr
- Kuwait Ceramics House (Bait Ghaith)
- Saud Al-Turaiji Museum
- Bait Alhusainan
- Kuwait Air Force Museum
- Hassan Ashkanani Museum
- Hamed Al Fuzaia Museum
- Saif Marzooq Al-Shamlan Museum
- Kuwait Police Museum
- Mubarak Kiosk
- Various museums at Youm Al Bahar Village
- Al-Asfoor Museum
- National Bank of Kuwait Museum
- Museum of Archaeology and Anthropology at Kuwait University
- Islamic Antiquities Museum of Kuwait
