= List of museums of Islamic art =

Islamic art is collected by museums, galleries and private collectors in many countries around the world.

Country	City	Institution	Collection size	Founding date	Official web site	Ref.
Algeria	Algiers	National Museum of Antiquities and Islamic Art				
Australia	Melbourne	Islamic Museum of Australia				
Austria	Vienna	Austrian National Library				
Austria	Vienna	Kunsthistorisches Museum				
Austria	Vienna	Museum of Applied Arts				
Austria	Vienna	Weltmuseum Wien				
Brunei	Brunei	Brunei Museum				
Canada	Toronto	Aga Khan Museum	1,000	2014		
Canada	Toronto	Royal Ontario Museum				
Denmark	Copenhagen	The David Collection	2,500	1945		
Egypt	Cairo	Museum of Islamic Art	100,000			
Egypt	Cairo	National Library				
Egypt	Cairo	Coptic Museum				
France	Paris	Bibliothèque nationale de France				
France	Paris	Arab World Institute				
France	Paris	Musée des Arts Décoratifs				
France	Lyon	Musée des Tissus et des Arts décoratifs				
France	Paris	Louvre Museum	18,000	2012		
Germany	Bamberg	Universitätsmuseum für Islamische Kunst	7,000	2008		
Germany	Berlin	Islamic Art Museum	16,000	1904		
Germany	Cologne	Rautenstrauch-Joest Museum				
Germany	Dresden	Dresden Museum of Ethnology				
Germany	Düsseldorf	Hetjens-Museum				
Germany	Hamburg	Museum für Kunst und Gewerbe				
Germany	Karlsruhe	Badisches Landesmuseum				
Germany	Leipzig	Leipzig Museum of Ethnography				
Germany	Munich	Museum Five Continents				
Germany	Stuttgart	Linden Museum				
Greece	Athens	Benaki Museum	8,000			
Iran	Kashmar	Hassan Modarres Museum	200	2004		
Iran	Isfahan	Museum of Decorative Arts, Isfahan	3,000	1995		
Iran	Mashhad	Astan Quds Razavi Central Museum		1937		
Iran	Mashhad	Great Museum of Khosran		2015		
Iran	Tehran	Abgineh Museum of Tehran				
Iran	Tehran	Calligraphy Museum of Iran	200	2017		
Iran	Tehran	Carpet Museum		1978		
Iran	Tehran	Dafineh Museum		1997		
Iran	Tehran	Gulistan Museum				
Iran	Tehran	Malek National Museum and Library	19,000	1996		
Iran	Tehran	Museum of Decorative Arts				
Iran	Tehran	Museum of the Islamic Era		1996		
Iran	Tehran	Reza Abbasi Museum		1977		
Iran	Shiraz	Pars Museum		1936		
Iran	Qom	Hazrat Ma'soomeh Holy Shrine Museum		1935		
Iraq	Baghdad	Iraq Museum				
Ireland	Dublin	Chester Beatty Library and Oriental Art Gallery	6,100			
Israel	Jerusalem	The Museum for Islamic Art		1974		
Italy	Florence	Bardini Museum				
Italy	Venice	Treasury of St. Mark's				
Italy	Milan	Biblioteca Ambrosiana				
Italy	Palermo	Museum of Islamic Art				
Jordan	Al-Mazār al-Janūbī	Al-Mazar Islamic Museum		1973		
Kuwait	Kuwait City	Dar al Athar al Islamiyyah (The al-Sabah Collection)	30,000	1980		
Kuwait	Kuwait City	Kuwait National Museum				
Kuwait	Kuwait City	Tareq Rajab Museum	30,000			
Malaysia	Kuala Lumpur	Islamic Arts Museum	10,000			
Morocco	Rabat	Archaeological Museum				
Oman	Muscat	National Museum of Oman				
Pakistan	Lahore	Lahore Museum				
Palestine	Jerusalem	Islamic Museum of the Haram al-Sharif				
Portugal	Lisbon	Calouste Gulbenkian Museum				
Qatar	Doha	Museum of Islamic Art				
Romania	Bucharest	National Museum of Art of Romania				
Russia	Saint Petersburg	State Hermitage Museum				
Russia	Moscow	Museum of Oriental Art				
Spain	Madrid	National Archaeological Museum				
Sweden	Stockholm	Museum of Mediterranean and Near Eastern Antiquities				
Switzerland	Bern	Abegg-Stiftung				
Switzerland	Geneva	Musée d'Art et d'Histoire				
Syria	Damascus	National Museum of Damascus				
Tunisia	Tunis	Bardo National Museum				
Turkey	Istanbul	Topkapı Palace				
Turkey	Istanbul	Turkish and Islamic Arts Museum	40,000			
Turkey	Istanbul	Vakiflar Museum				
Turkey	Istanbul	Archaeological Museum				
Turkey	Istanbul	Istanbul University Library				
Ukraine	Kyiv	Museum of Western and Oriental Art				
United Arab Emirates	Sharjah	Sharjah Museum of Islamic Civilization	5,000			
United Kingdom	Oxford	Ashmolean Museum				
United Kingdom	Oxford	Bodleian Library				
United Kingdom	London	British Library				
United Kingdom	London	British Museum	40,000			
United Kingdom	Edinburgh	Edinburgh University Library				
United Kingdom	Cambridge	Fitzwilliam Museum				
United Kingdom	London	Nasser D. Khalili Collection of Islamic Art	26,000 (largest private collection)	1970		
United Kingdom	London	Nasser D. Khalili Collection of Hajj and the Arts of Pilgrimage	5,000			
United Kingdom	London	Royal Asiatic Society				
United Kingdom	Edinburgh	National Museum of Scotland (formerly Royal Scottish Museum)				
United Kingdom	Manchester	John Rylands University Library				
United Kingdom	London	Victoria and Albert Museum	19,000			
United States	Baltimore	Walters Art Museum				
United States	Boston	Museum of Fine Arts	116			
United States	Cleveland	Cleveland Museum of Art				
United States	Corning	Corning Museum of Glass				
United States	Washington, D.C.	Freer Gallery of Art	2,200			
United States	Dallas	Keir Collection (currently on loan to the Dallas Museum of Art)	1,642			
United States	Los Angeles	Los Angeles County Museum of Art				
United States	New York	Metropolitan Museum of Art	15,000			
United States	New York	New York Public Library				
United States	St. Louis	Saint Louis Art Museum	250	1904		
United States	Honolulu	Shangri La Museum of Islamic Art, Culture & Design	2,500	2002		
United States	Washington, D.C.	George Washington University Museum and Textile Museum		1925		
Yemen	Sanaa	National Museum of Yemen		1971		

== See also ==
- Lists of museums
