= Souq Al-Mubarakiya =

Historic souq in Kuwait City, Kuwait

- سوق المباركية
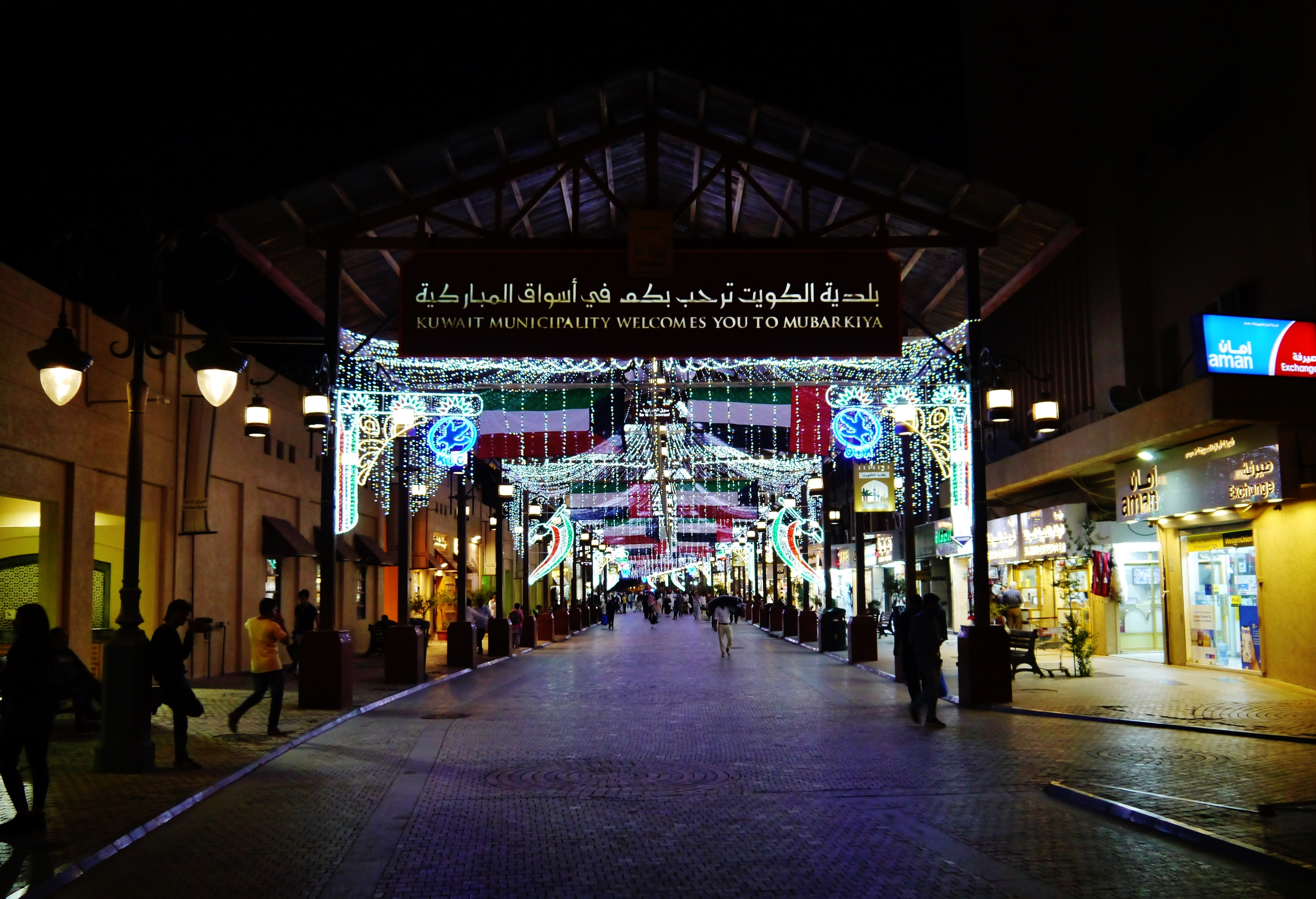
- Souq Al-Mubarakiya at night

General information
- Type: Souq
- Location: Kuwait City, Kuwait

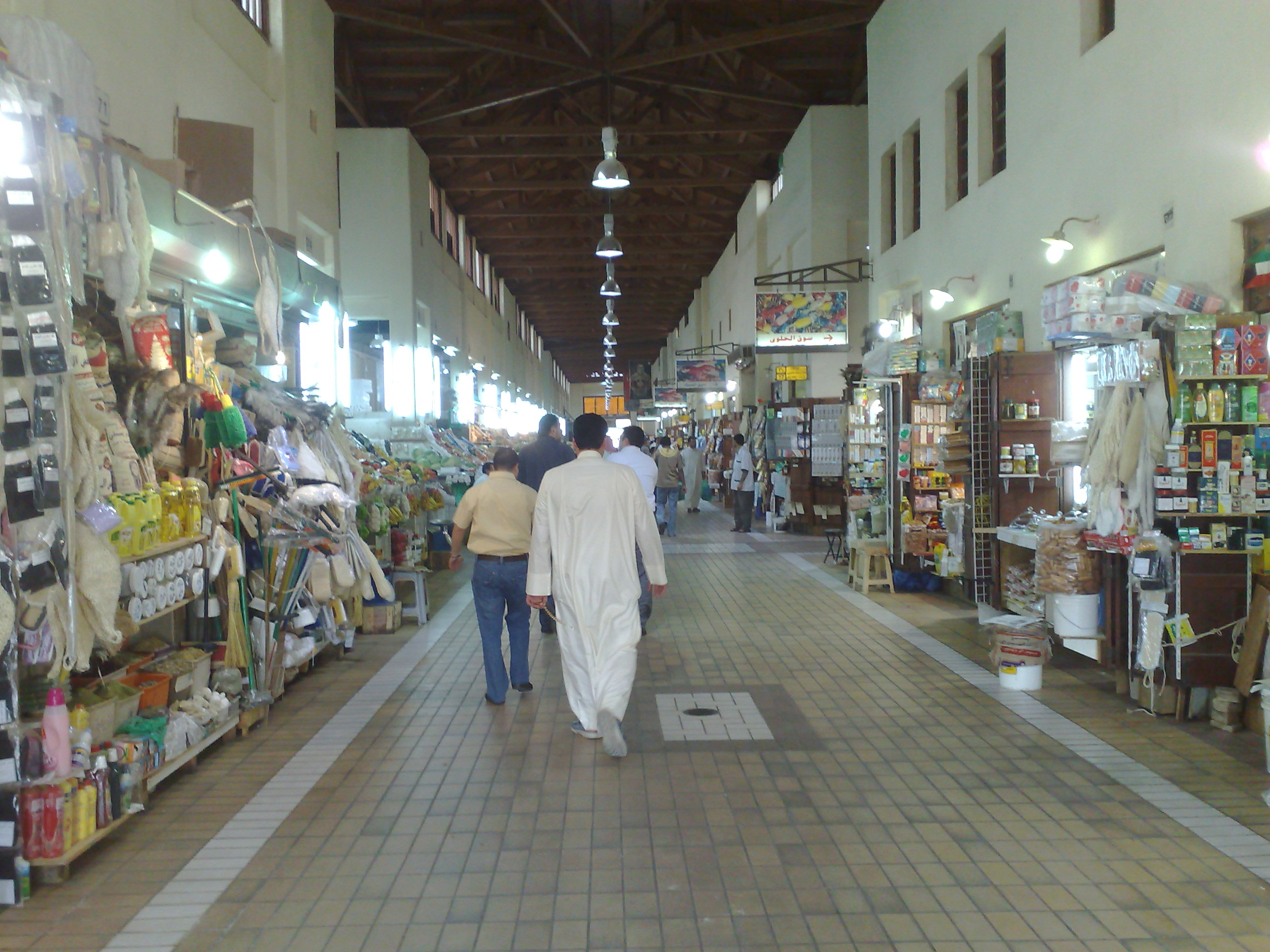

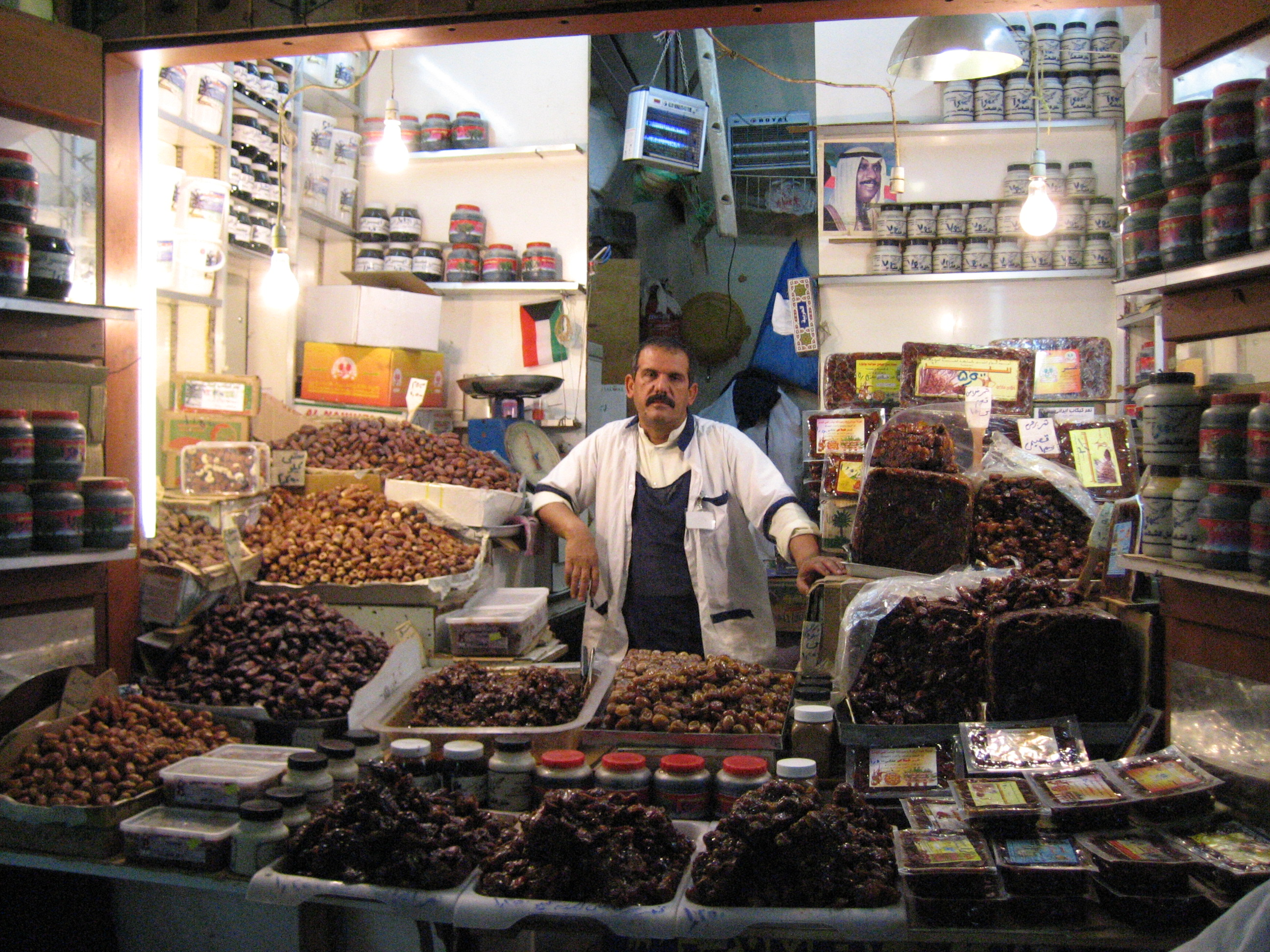
A date seller in Mubarakiya

Souq Al-Mubarakiya is a historic souq in Kuwait City, Kuwait. It is one of the oldest souqs in Kuwait, and was a center of trade prior to the discovery of oil.

This popular traditional market is located in Kuwait City, between Abdullah Al-Mubarak, Abdullah Al-Salem & Palestine Streets. This market has been around for at least 200 years. The market was damaged during the Iraqi invasion in 1990; however, it was renovated and it got back its traditional flavor.

Vendors sell goods such as Persian silk carpets, antiques, perfumes like musk and oud, gold and silver jewelry, and traditional costumes. Other goods sold at Al-Mubarakiya include dates, honey, spices, sweets, vegetables, fruits, meat, and fish. The market also hosts two small museums: Sheikh Mubarak Kiosk and the first pharmacy in Kuwait. Admission is free.

There is a courtyard near Masjid Al-Bahar (Sea Mosque) with traditional cafes that brew tea over coals, and several small restaurants serve authentic Arab and Persian food to the customers in the open air. On hot summer days, water mist is sprayed from pipes over the tables to cool visitors down. A children playground is nearby and shisha is also available.

On 31 March 2022, a section of the market was damaged by a major fire that destroyed shops.Following the fire, a consultative team was formed to oversee the rehabilitation and development of Souq Al-Mubarakiya. Kuwait Government Online reported in March 2023 that the team included representatives from Kuwait Municipality, the Voluntary Work Center, the Center of Research Studies on Kuwait, and a researcher in Kuwaiti history and heritage. In March 2024, Kuwait Finance House signed a reconstruction contract for the damaged area, stating that the project involved reconstructing about 17 buildings and developing nearby structures, with an estimated cost of about KD 8 million. Reconstruction work was still being monitored in 2025; the Kuwait Fire Force carried out a field inspection in September 2025 to review safety standards and fire-prevention measures at the project site.

== See also ==
- Kuwait National Cultural District
- List of museums in Kuwait
