= Al Salam Palace =

Al Salam Palace may refer to:

- As-Salam Palace, in Baghdad, Iraq
- Al Salam Palace (Kuwait), in Shuwaikh, Kuwait

== See also ==
- Al Alam Palace, Old Muscat, Oman
