= Nasser Sabah Al-Ahmad Al-Sabah =

Kuwaiti royal (1948–2020)

Nasser Sabah Al-Ahmad Al-Sabah ناصر صباح الأحمد الصباح
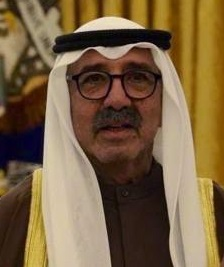

Deputy Prime Minister and Minister of Defense
- In office: 11 December 2017 – 18 November 2019
- Predecessor: Khaled Al Jarrah Al Sabah
- Successor: Ahmad Mansour Al-Ahmad Al-Sabah
- Monarch: Sabah Al-Ahmad Al-Jaber Al-Sabah

Minister of Amiri Diwan of Kuwait (Head of the Ruler's Court)
- In office: 12 February 2006 – 11 December 2017
- Predecessor: Nasser Al-Mohammed Al-Sabah
- Successor: Ali Al-Jarrah Al-Sabah
- Monarch: Sabah Al-Ahmed Al-Jaber Al-Sabah
- Born: 27 April 1948; Kuwait City, Kuwait
- Died: 20 December 2020 (aged 72); Kuwait City, Kuwait
- Spouse: Sheikha Hussa Sabah Al-Salim Al-Sabah
- Issue: Dana; Abdullah; Bibi; Sabah; Fahad; Fetouh
- House: Sabah
- Father: Sabah Al-Ahmad Al-Jaber Al-Sabah
- Mother: Sheikha Fatuwah Salman Al-Sabah

Styles of Sheikh Nasser Sabah Al-Ahmad Al-Sabah
- Reference style: His Excellency
- Spoken style: Your Excellency
- Alternative style: Sheikh

Sheikh Nasser Sabah Al-Ahmad Al-Sabah (Arabic: ناصر صباح الأحمد الصباح; 27 April 1948 – 20 December 2020) was the First Deputy Prime Minister, Minister of Defense of Kuwait, and before that he was the head of the Amiri Diwan in 2006–2017. Nasser was the eldest son of the hereditary ruler or Emir of Kuwait, Sabah Al-Ahmad Al-Jaber Al-Sabah (1929–2020). Prior to his death in December 2020, just seventy-two days after his father's death, Nasser was identified as a leading candidate to become the Crown Prince of Kuwait, or the heir apparent. He was a key figure in Kuwait's Vision 2035 plan, which included a planned city in northern Kuwait dubbed "Silk City".

== Career ==
After his father became ruler in 2006, Nasser was appointed Head of the Ruler's Court, or Minister of the Amiri Diwan of Kuwait. In 2017, he was appointed Deputy Prime Minister and Minister of Defense.

== Patron of Arts and Culture ==
Sheikh Nasser established Dar al Athar al Islamiyyah, a Kuwaiti cultural foundation based around the Al-Sabah Antiques Group. Sheikh Nasser Sabah was an honorary member of the Board of Trustees of the Metropolitan Museum of Art in New York City.

== Membership of Committees and Associations ==
- Head of the Committee for Common Development Enterprises between the State of Kuwait and the Islamic Republic of Iran - concerned with economic and political issues in the region, the organization's members also include many eminent Kuwaiti economists and political theorists
- Founder and member of Kuwait Red Crescent Society
- Founder and member of the Kuwaiti Association for the Protection of Public Funds
- Founder and member of Kuwait Equestrian Club
- Honorary President of the Kuwaiti Association of Formative Arts

== Death ==
Nasser's death was announced on 20 December 2020. After battling lung related problems since 2018. Sheikh Nasser was 72.
