= Al Salam Palace (Kuwait) =

- قصر السلام
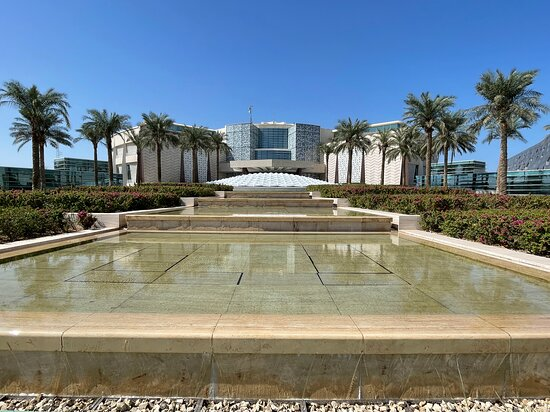
- Interactive map of the Al Salam Palace area
- Alternative names: Al Dheyafa Palace

General information
- Status: Completed
- Type: Museum
- Location: Shuwaikh, Shuwaikh, Kuwait, Kuwait
- Coordinates: 29°21′27.7″N 47°57′10.6″E
- Construction started: 1960s
- Inaugurated: 1964; 62 years ago
- Renovated: 2015-19
- Destroyed: 1990 invasion
- Cost: US$16.5 million
- Renovation cost: US$129 million

Technical details
- Floor count: 2
- Floor area: 32,000 m^{2} (344,400 sq ft)

Design and construction
- Architect: Medhat Al-Abed

Renovating team
- Renovating firm: SSH

Other information
- Parking: 3 subterranean levels

Website
- aspm.com.kw

The Al Salam Palace (Arabic: قصر السلام, Arabic for "Peace Palace") is a historic palace and museum located in Shuwaikh, Kuwait. It was originally established as an idea envisioned by the late Amir Sheikh Saad Al-Abdullah Al-Salem Al-Sabah in the late 1950s, when he aspired to build a special mansion for him and his family. To achieve that, the late Amir headed to Egypt to search for a specialized architect who could turn his vision of the mansion into reality. He eventually commissioned architect Medhat Al-Abed, who designed a round-shaped palace with magnificent interior decorations. Al Salam Palace is part of the new Kuwait National Cultural District (KNCD).

== History ==
In 1960, during the reign of late Amir Sheikh Abdullah Al-Salem Al-Sabah, construction works began for the palace's basic structure. However, in 1961 and after the official declaration of country's independence, some changes were made on the palace's residential plans due to the urgent need at that time for an official guesthouse for Kuwait's top visitors, including kings, presidents, and other prominent figures, in addition to a place to hold official and international conferences and meetings. Thus, the government decided to complete constructions for the spectacular building and transfer its ownership officially to the state. The palace was officially inaugurated in 1964, and received its first world leader guest in that same year.

Around 166 world leaders have stayed at Al Salam Palace since its official opening, including the likes of the Shah of Iran Mohammad Reza Pahlavi, former French President Valery Giscard d’Estaing and Charles and Diana, the Prince and Princess of Wales.

The palace, which total costs estimated nearly US$16.5 million, was characterized by its beautiful and luxurious facilities. Its fancy exterior round-shaped design reflected on its interior design, with its crystal chandeliers' lights visible through its windows, illuminating its superb vicinity at Shuwaikh beach for passersby to enjoy.

Al Salam Palace continued to receive Kuwait's guests until 1990, when Iraq invaded the country, destroyed the palace and stole its contents. Afterwards, the palace faded into oblivion after the country's liberation in 1991, especially after handing over its role and missions to the newly built Bayan Palace to host the country's guests.

The palace stayed abandoned and neglected until 2013, when Sheikha Mona Al-Jaber Al-Sabah, Head of Historic Documentation Center and the Amiri Diwan Libraries, proposed to restore the historic guesthouse and turn it into a museum that combines various time phases from the 300-year history of Kuwait. Combined Group Contracting has secured a KWD 39 million (US$129 million) contract to carry out the renovation and reconstruction of the Al Salam Palace.

Sheikha Mona's proposal received approval and encouragement by His Highness the Amir Sheikh Sabah Al-Ahmad Al-Jaber Al-Sabah, prompting the Amiri Diwan to carry out reconstruction of the palace until it was finally completed and officially inaugurated by His Highness the Amir on Monday, April 29, 2019.

The newly restored building houses a collection of rare artifacts and preserve the national cultural heritage of Kuwait. It has been designed to suit the modern generation provided with the latest technological display methods to presents the history of Kuwait to visitors in a creative and innovative manner.

== See also ==
- Kuwait National Cultural District
- Al Shaheed Park
- Sheikh Jaber Al Ahmad Cultural Centre
- Sheikh Abdullah Al-Salem Cultural Centre
