= Historical, Vintage, and Classical Cars Museum =

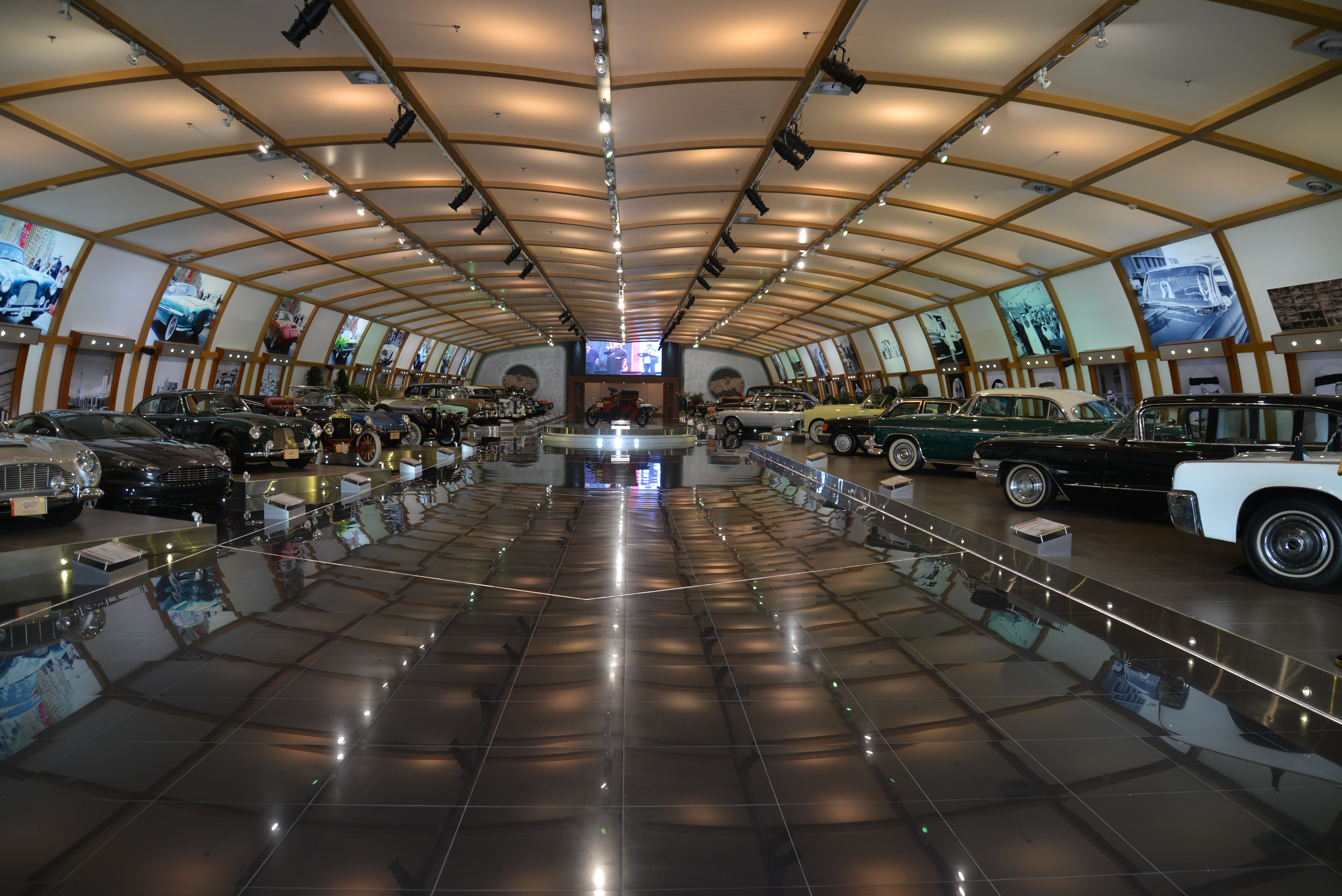
Main building of the Historical, vintage, and classic cars museum

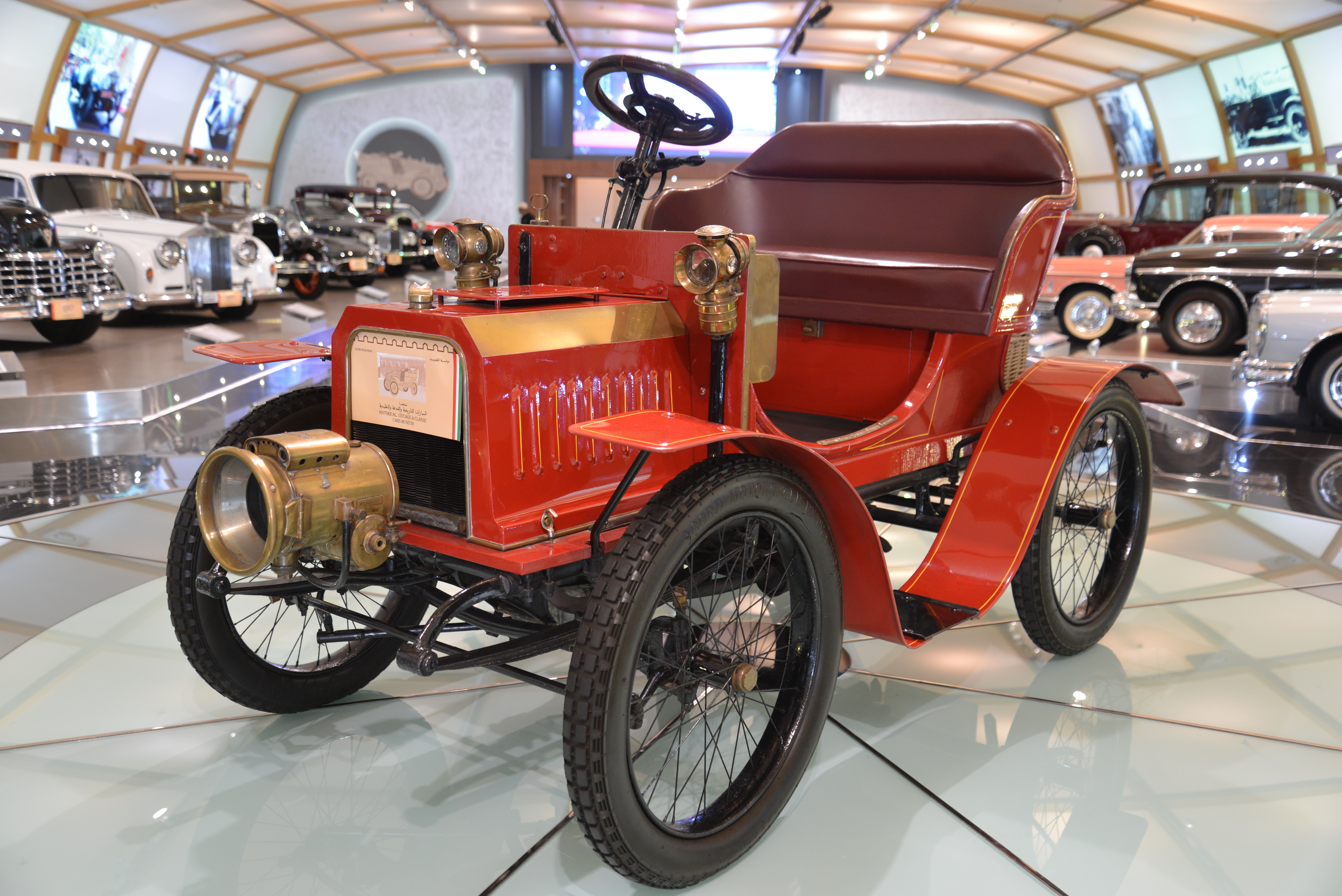
1904 Minerva Type A motor car in the museum

The Historical, Vintage, and Classical Cars Museum was located in Kuwait's Shuwaikh Industrial Area, near the intersection of road 80 and road 55.

== History and profile ==
The museum was opened in October 2010 (14 years ago). It consists of two buildings and an outside display area:

- one building houses the permanent exhibition of 30 restored important cars;
- another building contains a traffic parkour where children can practice their driving skills in electric cars;
- outside of both buildings there is a collection of less important cars in various conditions, including a "barn find" Ford Model T.

Additional cars are displayed on loan in other museums in Kuwait, e.g. the Bait al-Othman museum in Hawally.

The main collection can be grouped into 4 parts:

- the display of former state limousines of Kuwait
- state limousines from other countries or from Royal households
- a collection of 3 Aston Martins related to James Bond movies
- other important cars owned by the museum or by private collectors (including 2 Minervas from 1904 and 1924)

The museum used to be closed on Fridays and open on all other days 9:00 - 12:00 in the morning and 5:00 - 8:00 in the evening.

== See also ==
- List of museums in Kuwait
