= Bait Al-Othman Museum =

- Established: 1940 (built)
- Location: Kuwait City

Bait Al-Othman is a historic museum in Kuwait located in Hawalli. Inaugurated by the Amir of Kuwait in April 2013, the museum is dedicated to the history and culture of Kuwait from the pre-oil era to present time. The museum hosts numerous historical items and antiques of pre-oil Kuwait. Housh (courtyard), diwaniyas, muqallatt, kitchen, living room, master's bedroom and visitors’ room can all be seen. There are mini museums within the museum such as the Kuwait Drama Museum, Kuwait House Museum, Heritage Hall, Kuwaiti Souq, and Journey of Life Museum.

The museum has several phases. Phase 2 opened in December 2015. Phase 3 opened in April 2019.

== See also ==
- Museums in Kuwait
