= Islamic Antiquities Museum of Kuwait =

Museum in Al Jahra, Kuwait

- المتحف التراث الإسلامي في الكويت
- Location: Al Jahra, Kuwait
- Type: museum

The Islamic Antiquities Museum of Kuwait (Arabic: المتحف التراث الإسلامي في الكويت) is a private museum in Al Jahra, Kuwait founded by members of the Al-Naqib Al-Refa'i family, the descendants of Muhammad and Imam Husayn. It has been a project in progress for many years and now holds a collection of antiques and relics, some dating back to the earliest period of Islam till a more contemporary era since the founding of Kuwait. The collection includes rare manuscripts, miniatures, pottery, carpets, wood and stone carvings and adornments of the Kaaba and Rawdah in Majid an-Nebawi as well as various holy relics.

Much of the collection was procured from various family heirlooms in Mecca, Medina, Iraq, Kuwait and Egypt, all of which were under the protectorate of the Ottoman Empire. Furthermore, over the years, the collection has grown to become more inclusive of Islamic antiques from both outside the Arab world and inside Kuwait.

The Islamic Antiquities Museum of Kuwait works with museums, universities, archives, and other educational and cultural institutes to support the exposure of Kuwaiti and Islamic history. Furthermore, The Islamic Antiquities Museum of Kuwait specialises in the preservation, conservation, investigation and authentication of Islamic antiquities from the MENA region and Turkey.
