= Sadu House =

Coordinates: 29°22′28″N 47°58′2″E

- بيت السدو
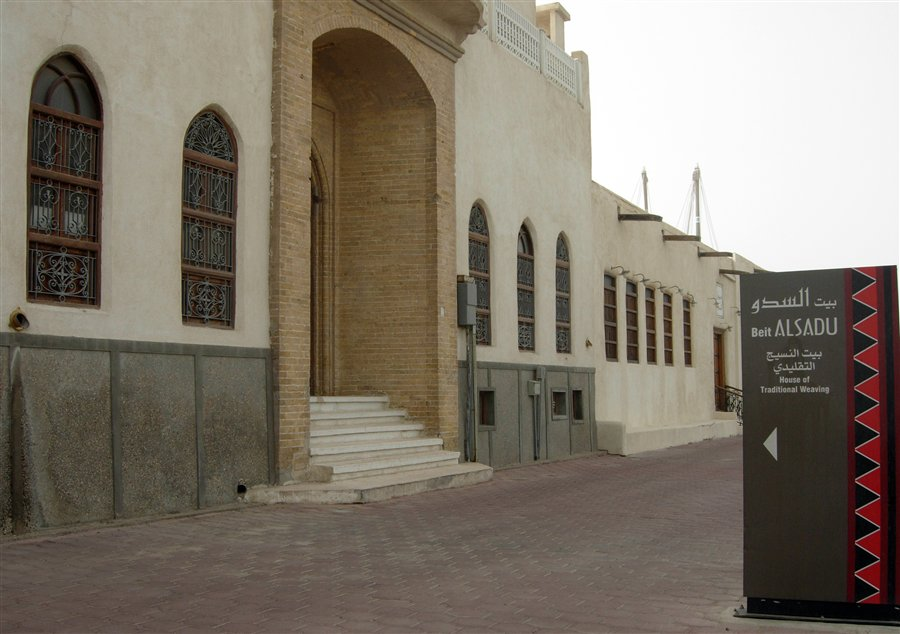
- Main entrance of the house, on Gulf Road.
- Established: 1980
- Location: Kuwait City
- Type: Museum & Cultural Center
- President: (Honorary) Sheikha Altaf Salem Al-Ali Al-Sabah
- Chairperson: Sheikha Bibi Duaij Al-Jaber Al-Sabah
- Website: www.alsadu.org.kw

Sadu House is an artistic house and museum in Kuwait City, Kuwait, located near the Kuwait National Museum.

== History ==
It was established by the Al Sadu Society in 1980 to protect the interests of the Bedouins and their ethnic handicrafts, Sadu weaving, which is an embroidery form in geometrical shapes hand woven by Bedouin people. The original house originally existed as a mud building in the early twentieth century but was destroyed during the 1936 Kuwaiti floods.

By 1984, Sadu House had registered 300 Bedouin women, producing about seventy items every week. A major tourist attraction in Kuwait City, Sadu House has several chambers each decorated with pottered motifs of houses, mosques etc.
