= Dar al Athar al Islamiyyah =

Cultural organization in Kuwait

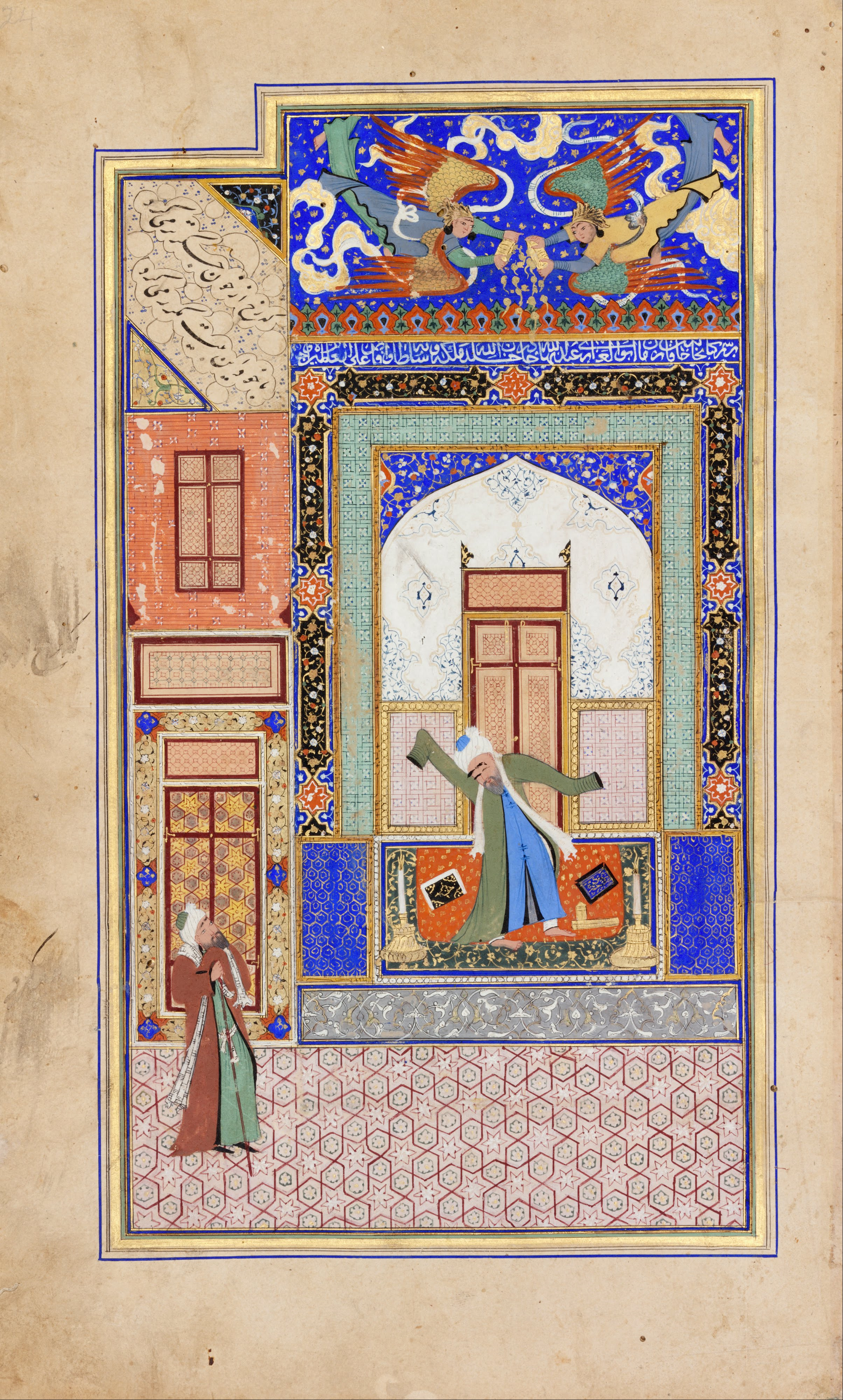
- Manuscript
- Interactive fullscreen map
- Established: 1980
- Location: Kuwait City
- Coordinates: 29.36794°N 47.96235°E
- Website: https://darmuseum.org.kw/

Dar al Athar al Islamiyyah is a cultural organization operating several cultural centers in Kuwait.

The organization has a collection of more than 20,000 items of rare Islamic art. The collection belongs to Sheikh Nasser Sabah Al-Ahmed Al-Sabah and his wife Sheikha Hussa Sabah Al-Salem Al-Sabah, who personally oversees the Kuwait National Museum. Many items, especially those from the pre-Islamic period, are housed at Amricani Cultural Centre in Kuwait.

The collection includes "books, manuscripts, ceramics, glass, metal, precious stones and jewelled objects, architectural ornaments, textiles and carpets, coins and scientific instruments."

The Dar al Athar al Islamiyyah cultural centres include education wings, conservation labs, and research libraries.

== See also ==
- List of Islamic art museums
