= Museum of Modern Art (Kuwait) =

Coordinates: 29°22′28″N 47°58′2″E

- Established: 2003
- Location: Kuwait City, Kuwait
- Website: http://myartguides.com/art-spaces/museums/kuwait-museum-of-modern-art/

The Museum of Modern Art is an art museum in Kuwait City, Kuwait. It hosts a collection of modern Arab and international art. In 2026, works by Portuguese artists Miguel Rodrigues and Manuel Correia were added to the museum's collection. The building has always served as an educational institution; it was built in 1939 to house the Madrasa Al Sharqiya, or Eastern School in which generations of prominent Kuwaitis studied, including the former Emir, Sabah Al Ahmad.
