= Al Shaheed Park =

Kuwaiti urban park

Coordinates: 29.370°N 47.994°E

- Interactive map of Al Shaheed Park
- Location: Kuwait
- Established: 2015
- Website: https://shaheedpark.da.gov.kw/

Al Shaheed Park is the largest urban park in Kuwait located in Al-Assima governorate, sitting at about 78.5 acres. Al Shaheed Park is considered the most significant green infrastructure project in Kuwait and has one of the largest over-structure green roofs in the world.

The park is part of the Kuwait National Cultural District (KNCD). The park consists of several phases. Phase II was inaugurated in April 2017 and Phase III (the largest) is currently under construction and was set to open in July 2024. As of November 2024 there are talks of deadline extension. Also There is a Phase IV and the final phase of Al Shaheed park in the future.

== Overview ==
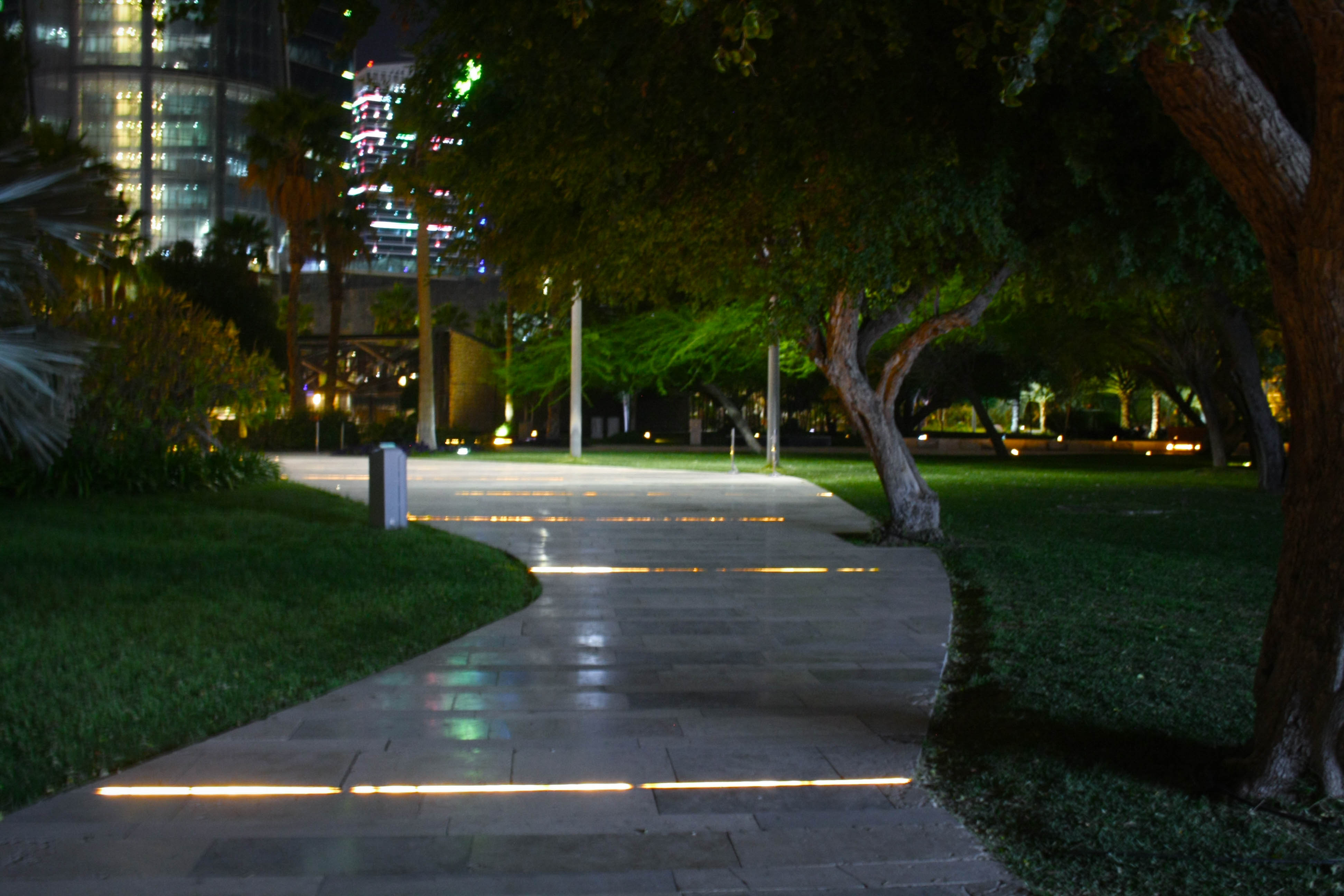

Al Shaheed Park is a comprehensive cultural complex featuring contemporary architecture and artistic installations. The park includes numerous gardens, walkways, museums, exhibition spaces, and outdoor theaters for cultural events. Its development occurs in phases, with Phase II opening in April 2017, introducing additions such as a skate park, youth complex, and open-air performance center.

Al Shaheed Park landscapes also hold multiple historical zones such as the Memorial zone and the Museum zone.

The park was an original component of the 1952 Kuwait master plan, but after construction on what is now phase 1, the rest of the project was put on hold to be revived once again in 2013.

== Museums ==
Al Shaheed Park contains two museums: Remembrance Museum and Habitat Museum.

The Memorial Museum exhibits important events in Kuwaiti history. In the center of the museum, there are four icons which symbolize the four most important battles in Kuwait's history.

The Habitat Museum is an exhibit about natural habitats of Kuwait, with a large number of interactive programs and scenographic recreations. Recreations of the plants and animals of Kuwait coexist with large format audiovisual productions. The museums offers an audio guide system.

== See also ==
- Kuwait National Cultural District
- Sheikh Jaber Al Ahmad Cultural Centre
- Sheikh Abdullah Al-Salem Cultural Centre
- Kuwait Vision 2035
