= Khalifa Alqattan =

Kuwaiti pioneer artist

Khalifa Alqattan (Arabic خليفة القطان ) (January 1934 in Old Kuwait City – 27 July 2003) was a Kuwaiti pioneer artist. He was the first Kuwaiti artist to hold a solo exhibition in Kuwait. In the early 1960s, he founded a new art theory known as "circulism".

His house was converted into an art museum in Kuwait known the Mirror House. It is a popular tourist attraction.
