= Kuwait National Museum =

Museum in Kuwait

Coordinates: 29°22′23″N 47°58′0″E

Kuwait National Museum متحف الكويت الوطني
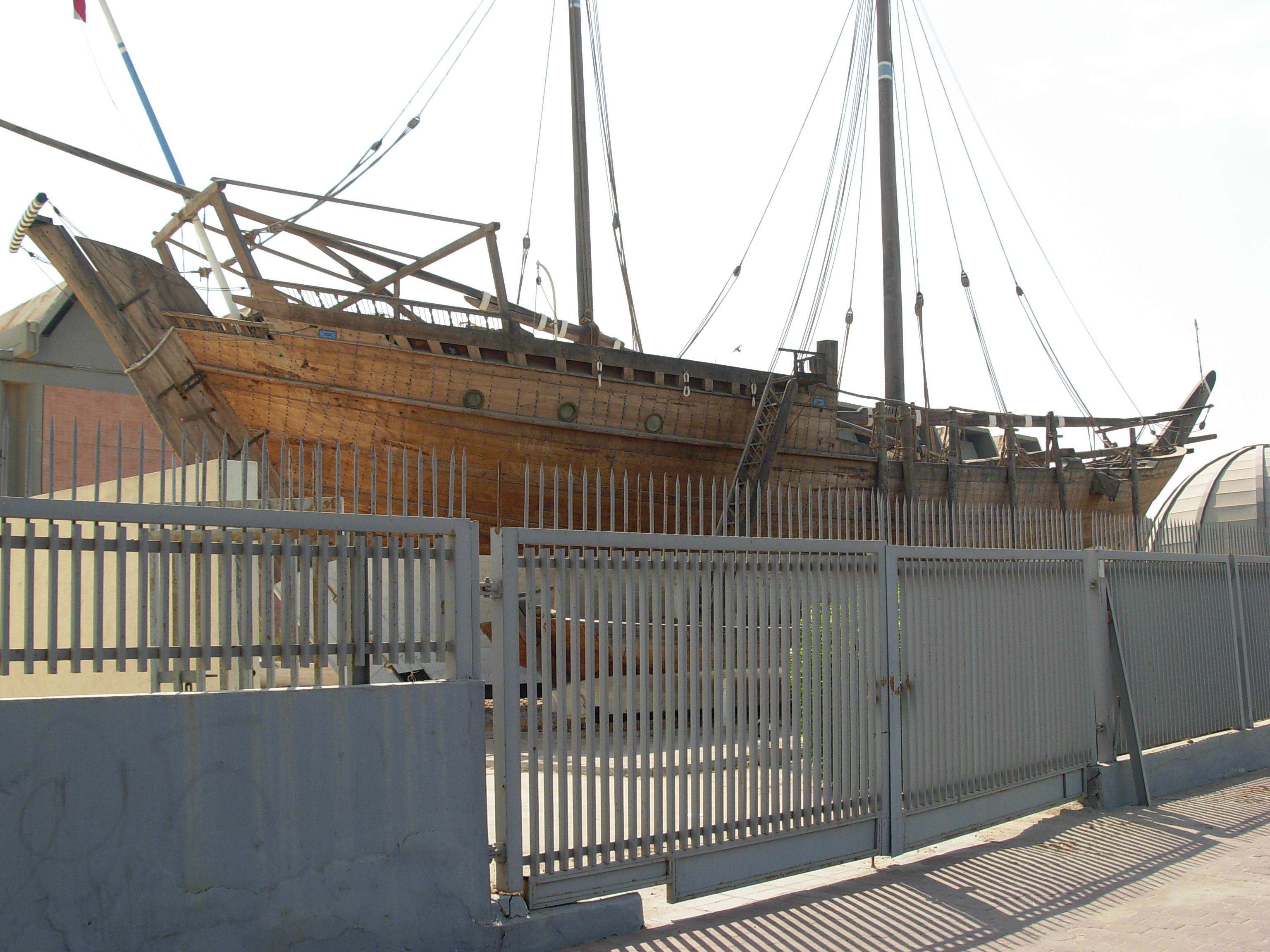
- Al Muhallab, an historic dhow at Kuwait National Museum
- Established: 1983
- Location: Kuwait City, Kuwait

The Kuwait National Museum is the national museum of Kuwait, located in Kuwait City. It was established in 1983 and designed by architect Michel Ecochard.

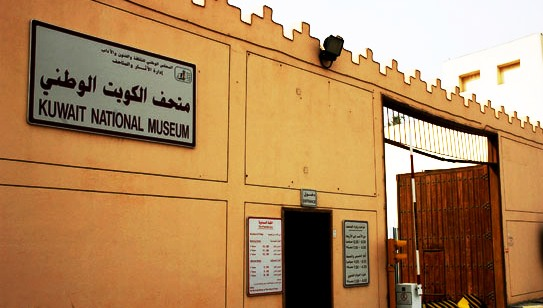
One of the entrances of Kuwait National Museum

The museum comprises five buildings set around a central garden, their organization is parallel to the architectural plan of the vernacular Arab mud house with its central courtyard. The main buildings are connected to each other with elevated walkways. Ecochard explains that the grouping of those buildings corresponds to knowledge of the region, its geography, its history and its civilization.

The museum has four main sections to it: 1. Kuwait Heritage Hall 2. Hall of Archeology 3. The Planetarium 4. Al Muhallab Dhow

== See also ==
- Kuwait National Cultural District
- Fateh Al-Khayr
