= Sheikh Abdullah Al-Salem Cultural Centre =

Cultural complex in Kuwait

- مركز الشيخ عبدالله السالم الثقافي
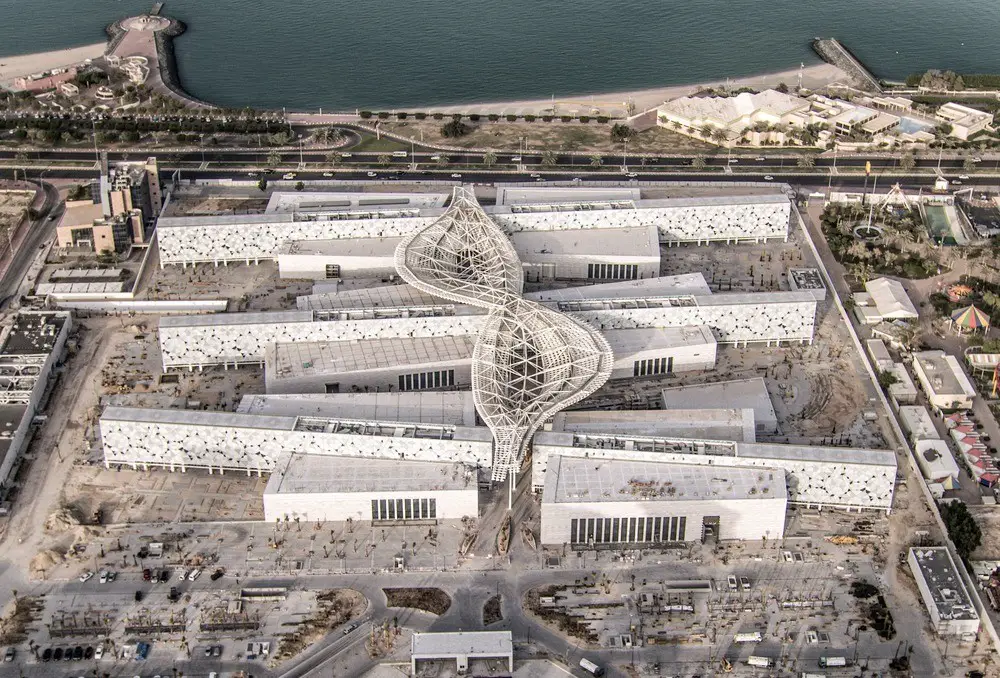
- Main courtyard
- Established: March 14, 2018; 8 years ago
- Location: Kuwait City, Kuwait
- Coordinates: 29.343917°N 48.041278°E
- Type: Cultural Centre
- Architect: SSH
- Owner: Amiri Diwan
- Website: www.ascckw.com

The Sheikh Abdullah Al-Salem Cultural Centre (Arabic: مركز الشيخ عبدالله السالم الثقافي) is a cultural complex located in Kuwait City Kuwait, owned by the Amiri Diwan. It consists of six main components; The Natural History Museum, Science Museum, Space Museum, Arabic Islamic Science Museum, Fine Arts Centre and the external spaces known as the Public Realm. The Sheikh Abdullah Al-Salem Cultural Centre is a 13-hectare site making it one of the world's largest museum complexes. The centre was inaugurated in early 2018, it was the world's largest single-delivery museum project.

The Sheikh Abdullah Al Salem Cultural Centre creates a new museum district within Kuwait. Together with the Sheikh Jaber Al Ahmad Cultural Centre, the cultural centre is part of the new Kuwait National Cultural District.

The museums present Kuwaiti, Islamic, and Arab culture and history. They also embrace and showcase the rich diversity of the world's finest cultural achievements. The museum is named after the late Sheikh Abdullah Al-Salem Al-Sabah who was the 11th ruler of Kuwait, the first Amir and the founder of modern Kuwait.

== Design ==
The project was administered by the Amiri Diwan who appointed Kuwaiti Architects SSH to design and engineer the building envelopes and components, which are connected through glazed wings and a canopy acting as the central spine of the cultural centre.

Alghanim International, a local main contractor, were appointed as the builders, tasked with constructing the museum envelopes and undertaking the extensive sitewide landscaping. London-based Cultural Innovations developed the visitor experience design. Exhibits at the Sheikh Abdullah Al-Salem Cultural Centre cover history, science, space, art, and culture.

The project forms the major part of Kuwait's new national cultural district.

=== Awards ===
In 2017, the Center received the Leaf Public Building of the Year award. In 2022, the centre was awarded the New Culture Destinations Of The Year 2021/2022 award for the Middle East and Africa by the Leading Cultural Destinations.

== Museums ==
=== Natural History Museum ===
Making up eight of the galleries across the complex, the Natural History Museum (NHM) covers themes including Prehistoric Life, Ecosystems, The Earth and Environment, Biodiversity, Nature, and Arabian Wildlife and Geography.

Within the NHM galleries is a South East Asian rain forest with a combination of living trees and plants interspersed with faux, overlooking a 1.4 million liter aquarium stocked with live species. The 6m x 6m concave end retaining panel together with the side viewing panels weigh over 65 tons providing a full underwater panorama of the aquarium.

The Prehistoric Life gallery includes over 30 full size prehistoric creatures both skeletal and full bodied.

Each museum has a glass clad wing protruding from the end. The Prehistoric Life wing includes a 17-meter-long prehistoric whale suspended above four displays of giant beasts from the distant past.

=== Science Museum ===
The Transport gallery houses over 200 historical and contemporary vehicles from full scale planes, boats and cars suspended from the roof structure, to full size replicas of the Bluebird and Bloodhound speed record vehicles and the Red Bull Stratos capsule. The technical installation methodology, coordination and structural challenges were significant within this gallery.

=== Space Museum ===
The Space Museum with four galleries and a 110-seat planetarium creates a futuristic museum exploring topics from the Big Bang to space travel, and Earth's place in the Solar System. At the centre, the planetarium was designed and built as part of the exhibition fit-out including the structural development and engineering for it to traverse the ground and mezzanine floors. A key section of the museum is an immersive model of the international space station (ISS) which gives the opportunity to learn about astronauts' life in the ISS, and the challenges involved in human living in space.

=== Arabic Islamic Science Museum ===
This museum is dedicated to the influences of Arabic scholars and inventors over history, and explores how and why Islamic civilization, and particularly the arts and sciences, flourished through the 8th to the 14th century.

=== Fine Arts Centre ===
The fine arts centre is dedicated to fine arts and showcases art exhibitions. In addition, the fine arts centre has an artist in-residency program to support artists in Kuwait.

== See also ==
- Kuwait National Cultural District
- Sheikh Jaber Al Ahmad Cultural Centre
- Al Shaheed Park
- Kuwait Vision 2035
