= Sheikh Jaber Al-Ahmad Cultural Centre =

- مركز الشيخ جابر الأحمد الثقافي
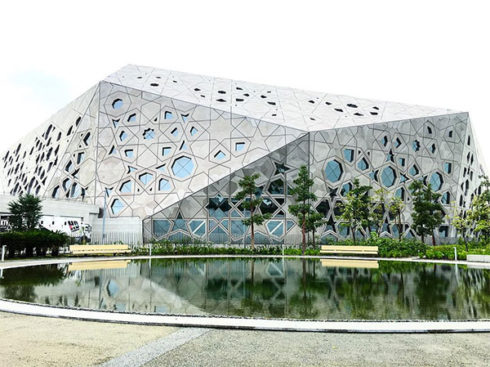
- Back view of the Sheikh Jaber Al-Ahmad Cultural Centre
- Interactive map of the Sheikh Jaber Al-Ahmad Cultural Centre area
- Alternative names: Kuwait Opera House

General information
- Status: Completed
- Type: Performing arts centre
- Architectural style: Expressionist
- Location: Shuwaikh, Shuwaikh, Kuwait, Kuwait
- Coordinates: 29°21′36.1″N 47°57′21.4″E
- Construction started: 2013
- Completed: February 2016
- Inaugurated: 31 October 2016; 9 years ago
- Cost: US $775 million
- Owner: Amiri Diwan

Technical details
- Floor area: 214,000 m^{2} (2,303,500 sq ft)

Design and construction
- Architect: SSH

Other information
- Seating capacity: Total 5,700
- Parking: 3 subterranean levels

Website
- https://www.jacc-kw.com/

The Sheikh Jaber Al-Ahmad Cultural Centre (Arabic: مركز الشيخ جابر الاحمد الثقافي, romanized: Markaz al-Shaykh Jābir al-Aḥmad al-Thaqāfī) (JACC), informally known as the Kuwait Opera House, is a cultural center in Kuwait, located on the Gulf Road in the capital Kuwait City. It is the largest cultural center and opera house in the Middle East. The cultural centre is part of the Kuwait National Cultural District.

The Sheikh Jaber Al-Ahmad Cultural Centre is a multidisciplinary public space owned by the Amiri Diwan. It offers a range of events in music, theatre, film, workshops and spoken word.

The cultural complex, which includes theatres, concert halls, music centres, conference and exhibition halls, cinemas, libraries, center for historical documents, and public park, took two years to complete. It is 214,000 m² in size and had a budget of US$775 million.

== Design ==
The cultural centre contains four buildings, which are organized around entrance courtyards off a civic plaza.

The design was inspired by Islamic architectural tradition. These are two dimensional patterns, which are transformed three dimensionally to create spaces below a complex geometric form. The buildings sit independently below the "jewel" which houses the functional requirements of the building.

The buildings are linked by a linear landscaped podium to the back of the buildings where the car parks and service areas are situated below ground. Visitors move from the car park via lifts and travelators to the courtyard access points at ground level.

The four buildings consist of full span steel envelopes which cover a series of independent concrete buildings. This primary steel grid is wrapped in a rainscreen weathertight envelope, with glazed areas supported by secondary steel, deck and insulation. This ‘inline’ surface is then protected with a series of titanium composite panels.

The buildings beneath are largely constructed of concrete and include a large excavated basement level connected with a series of services tunnels and MEP areas. The buildings are independently circulated with stairs and lifts and walkways, with public level access in most cases being ground level upwards.

== See also ==
- Kuwait National Cultural District
- Sheikh Abdullah Al-Salem Cultural Centre
- Music of Kuwait
- Culture of Kuwait
- Kuwait Vision 2035
