= Amiri Diwan of Kuwait =

Ruler's Court of the State of Kuwait

The Amiri Diwan of the State of Kuwait (Arabic: الديوان الأميري الكويتي) serves as the royal court of the Emir of Kuwait.

== History ==
Due to Kuwait's unique geographical position, it has been a major trading centre. This was especially evident during the reign of Sheikh Mubarak Al Sabah who ruled the country from 1896 to 1915. During this time, many delegations and merchants came to Kuwait to conduct business. Thus, the need for a palace that would be the reigning monarch's headquarters and government office became acute. In 1904, a decision was taken to build a palace overlooking the sea (al seif). It therefore became known as Seif Palace. Since then, Kuwait's rulers have developed and expanded the original palace. Sheikh Salim Al-Mubarak Al-Sabah was the first to renew the building in 1917. On its main gate, the words: “If it lasted for others it wouldn’t have passed to you” are inscribed. Sheikh Abdullah III Al-Salim Al-Sabah also carried out major alterations and additions in 1961, and by the end of the following year, it was named "Al-Diwan Al-Amiri". During Sheikh Abdullah III Al-Salim Al-Sabah's reign, the Amiri Diwan was headed by Sheikh Khaled Al-Ahmed Al-Jaber who continued in this role until 1990. When Kuwait was liberated from the Iraqi invasion of 1990, Sheikh Nasser Mohammed Al-Ahmed Al-Sabah took over as Minister of the Amiri Diwan on September 10, 1991. His successor and the present incumbent is Sheikh Nasser Sabah Al-Ahmed Al-Jaber Al-Sabah who took up the position on February 12, 2006.

== List of ministers of the Amiri Diwan ==
The Amiri Diwan has been headed by the following people since the reign of the eleventh ruler of Kuwait and first emir of the State of Kuwait, Sheikh Abdullah Al-Salem Al-Sabah:

#	Name	Portrait	Title	Tenure	Note
1	Khaled Ahmad Al-Jaber Al-Sabah		Minister of the Amiri Diwan	1962–10 September 1991	Full brother of 6th Emir of Kuwait Nawaf Al-Ahmad Al-Jaber Al-Sabah
2	Sheikh Nasser Al-Mohammed Al-Sabah		Minister of the Amiri Diwan	10 September 1991–12 February 2006	7th Prime Minister of the State of Kuwait (2006–2011)
3	Nasser Sabah Al-Ahmad Al-Sabah		Minister of the Amiri Diwan	12 February 2006–11 December 2017	Former Deputy Prime Minister and 13th Minister of Defense of Kuwait
4	Ali Al-Jarrah Al-Sabah		Minister of the Amiri Diwan	11 December 2017–12 October 2020	Former Deputy Minister of the Amiri Diwan Affairs
5	Mubarak Faisal Saud Al-Sabah		Minister of the Amiri Diwan	12 October 2020–12 August 2021	Former Head of the Diwan of the Crown Prince
6	Mohammad Abdullah Al-Mubarak Al-Sabah		Minister of the Amiri Diwan	12 August 2021-present	Former Deputy Minister of State for Amiri Diwan Affairs

== See also ==
- Kuwait National Cultural District
- Government of Kuwait
- House of Sabah
