= Kuwait National Cultural District =

The Kuwait National Cultural District (also known as the KNCD) is multibillion-dollar development project that focuses on the arts and culture in Kuwait. With a capital cost of more than US$1 billion, the project is one of the largest cultural investments in the world today. The Kuwait National Cultural District is a member of the Global Cultural Districts Network.

The District has three cultural clusters:

- Western shores: Sheikh Jaber Al-Ahmad Cultural Centre and Al Salam Palace
- Eastern shores: Sheikh Abdullah Al-Salem Cultural Centre
- Edge of the City Centre: Al Shaheed Park Museums: Habitat Museum and Remembrance Museum

The Sheikh Jaber Al Ahmad Cultural Centre is the largest cultural center and opera house in the Middle East. The Abdullah Al-Salem Cultural Centre is a 13-hectare (32-acre) site with a total exhibit area of 22,000 m2, making it the world's largest museum project. Al Shaheed Park is the largest green roof project ever undertaken in the Arab world. The new cultural district is an essential part of Kuwait Vision 2035.

== Gallery ==
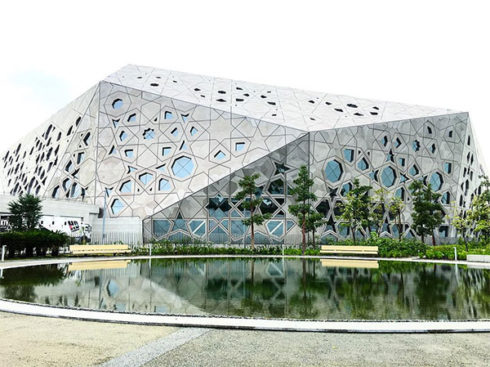
Sheikh Jaber Al-Ahmad Cultural Centre

== See also ==
- Madinat al-Hareer
- Sheikh Jaber Al-Ahmad Al-Sabah Causeway
- Mubarak Al Kabeer Port
- Sabah Al Ahmad Sea City
- Al Mutlaa City
