= Jabriya District =

District of Hawalli Governorate, Kuwait

Jabriya District is one of the districts of Hawalli Governorate in Kuwait.

Jabriya hosts a large number of facilities beginning from hospitals such as Mubarak Al-Kabeer Hospital and private clinics such as Al Hadi Hospital and has in Block 12 the New English School. It also has three Starbucks Coffee branches (one which is in Al Hadi Hospital) and also has a Hardee's, McDonald's and two KFC branch. The Sultan Center opened a branch in Block 12 of Jabriya and there are also the local co-op/supermarkets. There is also a branch for the National Bank of Kuwait and Al Ahli Bank. Also in Jabriya just on the borders with Hawalli is the Kuwait Central Blood Bank. There is also a Medical Research Center.

Jabriya is home to many foreigners who work in schools close by and of course it contains a large number of Kuwaitis. Houses in Jabriya are between 2-4 stories tall. From Jabriya, you can get onto the Fahaheel Expressway which leads to areas such as Bayan, Salwa, Rumathiya and Abu Halifa.

The Tareq Rajab Museum is located in Jabriya

Jabriya is situated in the Third Electoral constituency.
