= Jehan Rajab =

Brazil-born Kuwaiti author (1934–2015)

- Born: Jehan Welbourne; 1934; Brazil
- Died: 5 April 2015 (aged 81); Kuwait
- Citizenship: British, Kuwaiti (by marriage)
- Occupation: Director of New English School
- Spouse: Tareq Rajab
- Writing career
- Notable work: Invasion Kuwait: An English Woman's Tale

Jehan Rajab (née Welborne, 1934 – 5 April 2015) was a Brazil-born Kuwaiti author of British origin. She stayed in Kuwait from 1959 before she wrote her book titled Invasion Kuwait: An English Woman's Tale which was an account of life in Kuwait during the Iraqi invasion of Kuwait from her own point of view and married Tareq Rajab in 1955 in England who was the 5th Kuwaiti to marry a western woman & the 1st Kuwaiti to go abroad to study Art and archeology. In accordance with Kuwait law, through her marriage she was able to gain Kuwaiti citizenship (as per Kuwait citizenship law granting females married to Kuwaiti males the Kuwaiti citizenship). She worked as the first director of the department of antiquities and museums of Kuwait. Jehan stayed in Jamaica, Portugal, and the Cape Varde Island during her childhood. She had 3 children including Dr. Ziad Rajab who is the current director of the New English School. She had a hard time settling in Kuwait due to the lack of facilities and found it harder to adjust to the cool winter than hot summers. She co-founded the Tareq Rajab Museum and The New English school with her husband in 1980 and 1969 respectively. Jehan also appeared in a documentary called Class of 1990. She died on 5 April 2015 at the age of 81. Her funeral took place in Jabriya.

== Works ==
- Rajab, J. (1989). Palestinian Costume. Indiana University. ISBN 0-7141-2517-2.
- Invasion Kuwait: An English Woman's Tale
- Kedgeree and Rhubarb Crumble: Recipes from a Cosmopolitan Childhood
- Silver Jewellery of Oman
