= Kuwait Medical Association =

Coordinates: 30°28′59″N 47°48′32″E

Kuwait Medical Association الجمعية الطبية الكويتية
- Formation: 1963; 62 years ago
- Headquarters: Kuwait
- Location: Jabriya, Hawalli
- President: Dr. Ahmad AlEnizi
- Vice-President: Dr. Ali AlMusawi
- Secretary General: Dr. Salem AlKanderi
- Website: Official website

Kuwait Medical Association was founded in October 1963. It is an establishment which provides and represents all doctors in Kuwait. The Kuwait Medical Association headquarters are in the Kuwait Medical Professionals building. It is located in Jabriya very close to the Kuwait Central Blood Bank.

The Kuwait Medical Association is part of the larger Kuwait Medical Professionals Organisation, which also includes the Kuwait Pharmaceutical Association and the Kuwait Dental Association.
