= Jabriya =

Jabriya الجابرية
- City
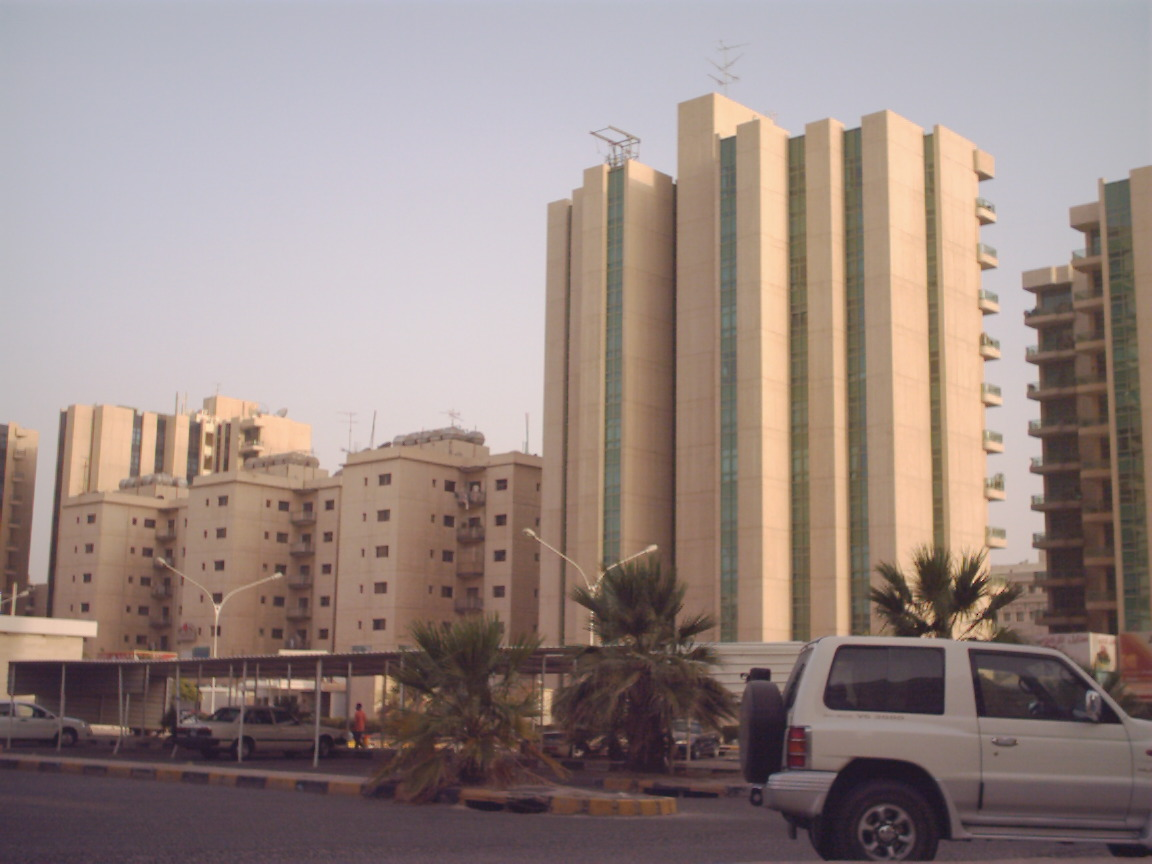
- Residential Buildings in Jabriya

- Location within Kuwait
- Coordinates: 29°19′N 48°2′E
- Country: Kuwait
- Province: Hawalli Governorate

Population
  - Total: 66,056
- Area codes: 531, 532, 533, 534

Jabriya (Arabic: الجابرية) is in an area in Hawalli Governorate in Kuwait. It is a large, mainly residential area that borders Surra, Hawalli, Salmiya and Bayan.

On 31 December 2007, Jabriya's population was estimated to be 66,056.

Mubarak Al-Kabeer Hospital, one of the six public hospitals in Kuwait, was built there in 1982. Other organisations within the area include the Kuwait Medical Association (KMA) and the Kuwait Central Blood Bank. Jabriya is located in the Third Electoral constituency. Jabriya is divided into twelve blocks with two blocks, 1 and 3, sectioned into A and B parts. Jabriya contains more than ten schools, a large number for its size, including New English School, The English Academy, Bayan Bilingual School and Fajr Al Sabah. Jabriya has many foreign workers.

Like other parts of Kuwait City, Jabriya has traffic problems, but even more serious. Jabriya is also well known for its relative safety and diversity.

Houses in Jabriya are between 2 and 4 storeys tall. From Jabriya, one can access the Fahaheel Expressway which leads to Bayan, Salwa, Rumaithiya and Abu Halifa.

Jabriya has a subway pedestrian tunnel that passes under road no. 30 and connects it with Salmiya.

== Landmarks ==
- Husainiyat Al-Bulush (largest hussainia in Jabriya)
- Mubarak Al-Kabeer Hospital named after Shiekh Mubarak Al-Kabeer Al-Sabah. It serves the Hawalli Governorate and covers about 700,000 people in the area.
- Hadi Hospital
- Health Science Center and Faculty of Medicine
- Kuwait Central Blood Bank

== Museums ==
- Tariq Rajab Museum opened in 1980
- Dar El CID

== Mosques ==
- Al-Bulush Mosque
- Al Mawash Mosque
- Al Qatan Mosque, built in 1987
- Modi Abdullatif Al-Othman Mosque, built in 1984
- Mohammed Taleb Al Kandari Mosque
- Mubarak Al Kabeer Mosque

== Embassies in Jabriya ==
A number of embassies are located in Jabriya:

Armenia
Bulgaria
Jordan
Netherlands
Pakistan
Philippines
Poland
Serbia
Eswatini
Thailand
Vietnam
Yemen

== See also ==
- Tareq Rajab Museum
