= Kuwait Central Blood Bank =

Blood bank - Affiliated with the Kuwaiti Ministry of Health

Coordinates: 29°19′37″N 48°1′49″E

Central Blood Bank
- بنك الدم المركزي
- Emblem of Kuwait

Agency overview
- Headquarters: Jabriya, Hawalli (Kuwait)
- Agency executives: Rana Al-Abdulrazzak, Director of Medical and Donor Affairs; FOUNDER, Abdulaziz Al-Bashir
- Parent agency: Ministry of Health
- Website: http://www.kcbb.org/

Kuwait Central Blood Bank is the only blood bank in Kuwait being operated by the government. It is located in Jabriya behind Mubarak Al-Kabeer Hospital.

== History and profile ==
It was established and founded on 25 May 1965 by Abdulaziz Al-Bashir, haematologist. It became an accredited member with the American Association of Blood Banks (AABB) in 1989 and has been a participant of the college of American Pathologists (CAP) since 1994.
