= Hawalli =

Hawalli may refer to:

- Hawalli Governorate, a governorate in Kuwait
- Hawalli, Kuwait, the capital of Hawalli Governorate
- Hawalli, India
