= Salwa, Kuwait =

Salwa سلوى
- Area
- Location within Kuwait
- Coordinates: 29°18′N 48°5′E
- Country: Kuwait
- Governorate: Hawalli Governorate

Government
  - Sheikh: Sheikh Meshal Jaber Alsabah

Population
  - Total: 36,108
- Time zone: UTC+3 (AST)

Salwa (Arabic: سلوى) is an area in Hawalli Governorate in Kuwait City, Kuwait, bordering Rumaithiya to the north, Bayan and Mishref to the west, Messila to the south and the Persian Gulf to the east. It had the first zoo in Kuwait, established in 1954, which closed and relocated to the Kuwait Zoo in 1968. The South African Embassy in Kuwait is in Salwa.
