= Amiri Hospital =

Coordinates: 29°23′16″N 47°59′13″E

Amiri Hospital المستشفى الأميري
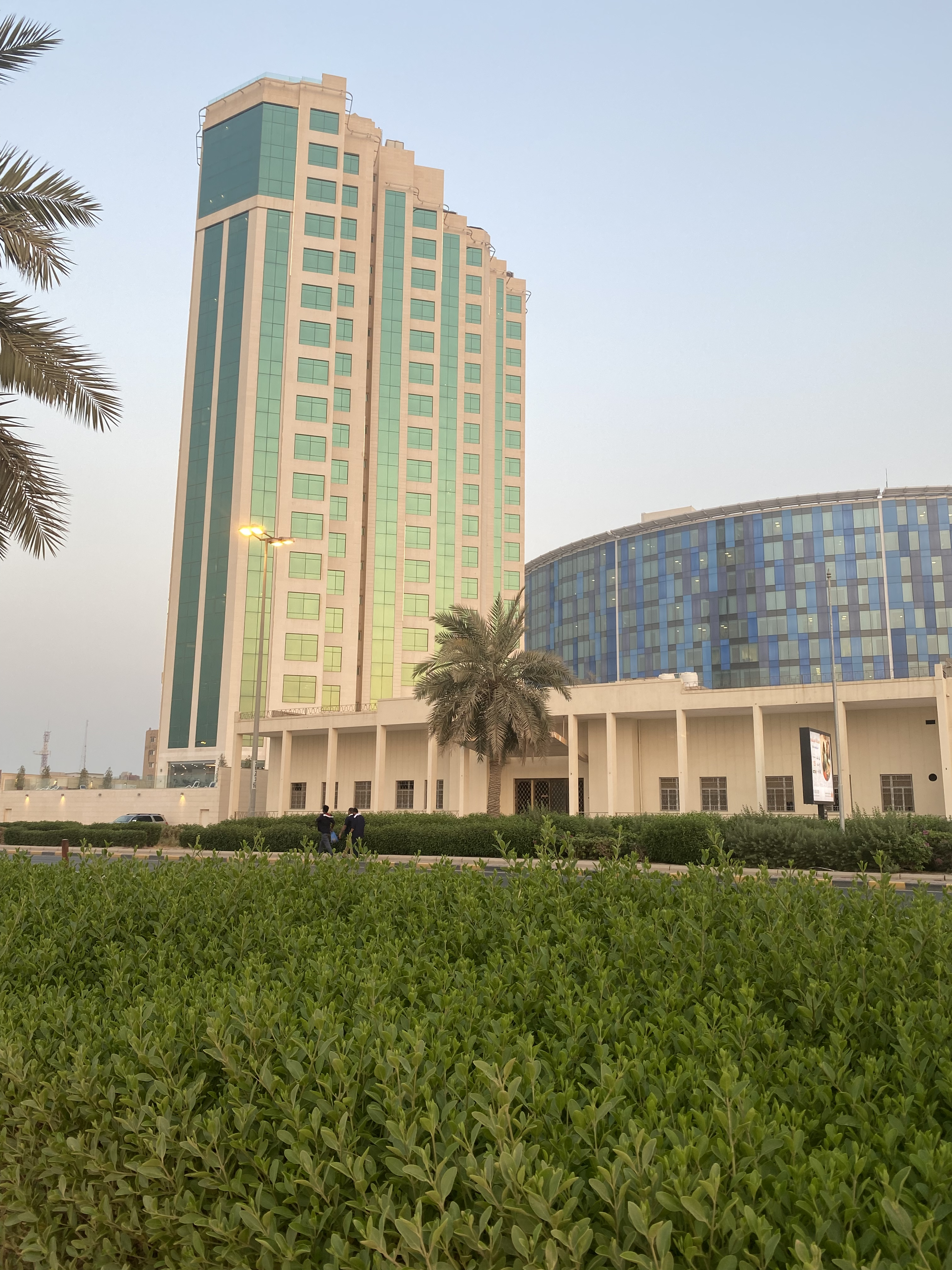
- New Amiri Hospital & Amiri Residences

Geography
- Location: Kuwait City, Kuwait

Services
- Beds: 630

History
- Founded: 1949

Links
- Website: https://amrh-pp.moh.gov.kw/

The Amiri Hospital (Arabic: المستشفى الأميري) is a general hospital located in Kuwait City. It serves an estimated 400,000 patients per year.

== History ==
Construction of Amiri Hospital began in 1941, but work was interrupted by the Second World War. It officially opened on 18 October 1949 under the patronage of Sheikh Ahmad Al-Jaber Al-Sabah, becoming Kuwait's first government owned hospital. Before that there was only the US missionary hospital and small clinics run by doctors in their own houses. The original hospital building was closed in the 1970s after the opening of the new modern building.

At its opening, the hospital had 45 beds, operating rooms, a laboratory, and a pharmacy. During the 1950s, the hospital underwent successive expansions, with additional wards constructed on the southern side of the original building. By 1961, it had 15 wards with a total of 620 beds.

In 1977, a decision was made to demolish the original building and construct a replacement. The hospital was rebuilt in 1984.

On 10 February 2010, the Sabah Al-Ahmad Cardiac Centre opened adjacent to Amiri Hospital. The centre was funded by a donation of approximately KD 3 million from Sheikh Sabah Al-Ahmad Al-Sabah and included cardiac catheterisation, surgical and intensive care facilities.

Plans for a further expansion of Amiri Hospital entered the construction tendering stage in 2011. The development was intended to increase the hospital's bed capacity and provide additional specialist clinics and diagnostic facilities. The foundation stone for the new hospital tower was laid on 5 June 2013. The project, valued at approximately KD 98 million, included plans for a 12-storey tower with 415 additional beds, outpatient clinics, and operating theatres.

The expansion was inaugurated on 20 December 2018 by Prime Minister Sheikh Jaber Al-Mubarak Al-Hamad Al-Sabah. The new facilities included medical departments, outpatient clinics, inpatient wards, and reception areas.

== Building ==
The current main building of Amiri Hospital is located on the Arabian Gulf Street, overlooking the Persian Gulf. It comprises ten floors and a basement.

== See also ==
- List of hospitals in Kuwait
