= Bayan Palace =

Main palace of the Emir of Kuwait

Coordinates: 29°18′2″N 48°1′55″E

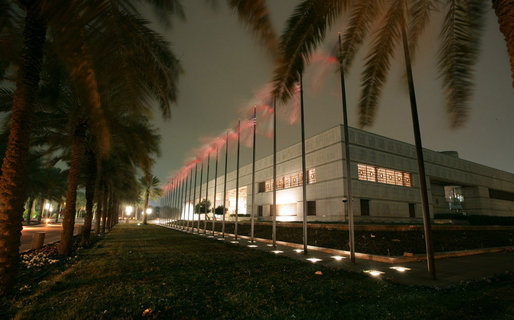
The Bayan Palace serves as the seat of the Government of Kuwait

Bayan Palace (Arabic: قصر بيان Qaṣr Bayān) is the main palace of the Emir of Kuwait. It is located in the Bayan area.

== History ==
Bayan Palace was opened in 1986 to host the fifth conference of the Arab League. The palace also has an international conference centre attached. There is also a 0.35-hectare (0.86-acre) Emiri tent within the palace grounds, which was erected in 1991 after the liberation of Kuwait.
