= Kuwait Cancer Control Center =

Geography
- Location: Shuwaikh, Kuwait City, Kuwait
- Coordinates: 29.325051°N 47.903237°E

Services
- Beds: 200

History
- Opened: 1968

Links
- Website: kccc-cru.com
- Lists: Hospitals in Kuwait

The Kuwait Cancer Control Center or KCCC (Arabic: مركز الكويت لمكافحة السرطان) is a comprehensive center dedicated to the purpose of providing Cancer Care across the State of Kuwait. KCCC has been serving the Kuwaiti cancer population since 1968. With over 600 highly qualified oncology staff, KCCC is a 200-bed hospital complex located in Shuwaikh. The center is made up of seven buildings, each specialized in a treatment area of cancer:

- Radiotherapy Building
- Hussain Makki Juma Center for Specialized Surgery
- Faisal Sultan Bin Essa Center for Radiodiagnosis and Radiotherapy
- Sheikha Badriya Al Ahmed Al Jaber Al Sabah Center for Oncology and Stem Cell Transfusion
- Palliative Care Center
- Yacoub Behbehani Laboratory Building & Bone Marrow Transplantation Center
- NBK Pediatric Hospital
