= Adān =

Coordinates: 29.2329°N 48.0672°E

ʿAdān (Arabic: العدان, Gulf Arabic pronunciation: il-ʿAdān) is a residential area in the Mubarak Al-Kabeer Governorate in Kuwait, located approximately 18 kilometres (11 mi) from the centre of Kuwait City, the national capital.
