= Healthcare in Kuwait =

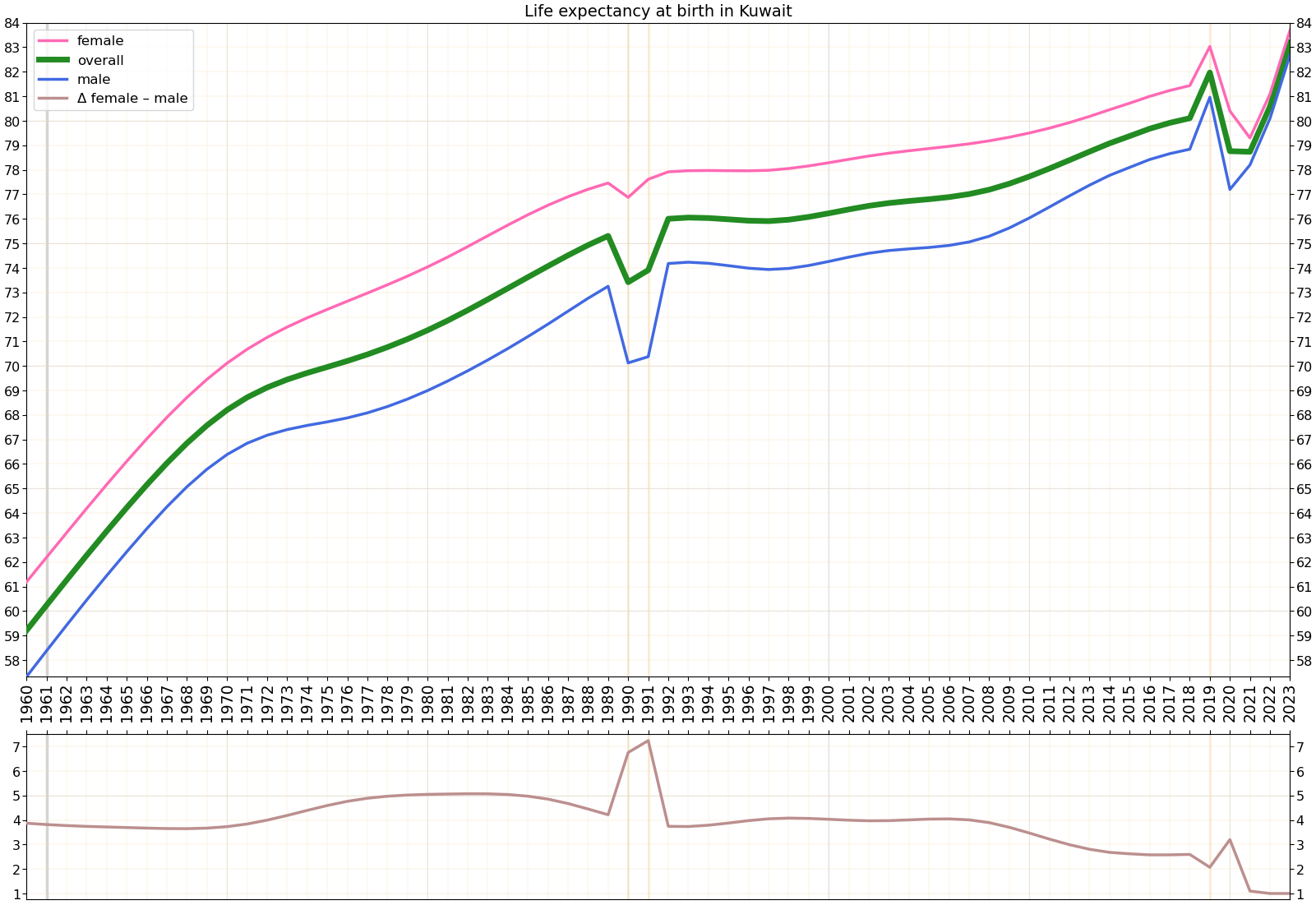
Life expectancy development in Kuwait by gender

Kuwait has a state-funded healthcare system, which provides treatment without charge to holders of a Kuwaiti passport. A public insurance scheme exists to provide healthcare to non-citizens. Private healthcare providers also run medical facilities in the country, available to members of their insurance schemes. As part of Kuwait Vision 2035, many new hospitals have opened.

In the years leading up to the COVID-19 pandemic in 2019, Kuwait invested in its health care system at a rate that was proportionally higher than most other GCC countries. As a result, the public hospital sector significantly increased its capacity. Kuwait currently has 20 public hospitals. The new Sheikh Jaber Al-Ahmad Hospital is considered the largest hospital in the Middle East. Kuwait also has 16 private hospitals.

== See also ==
- Health in Kuwait
- List of hospitals in Kuwait
