= Jahra Hospital =

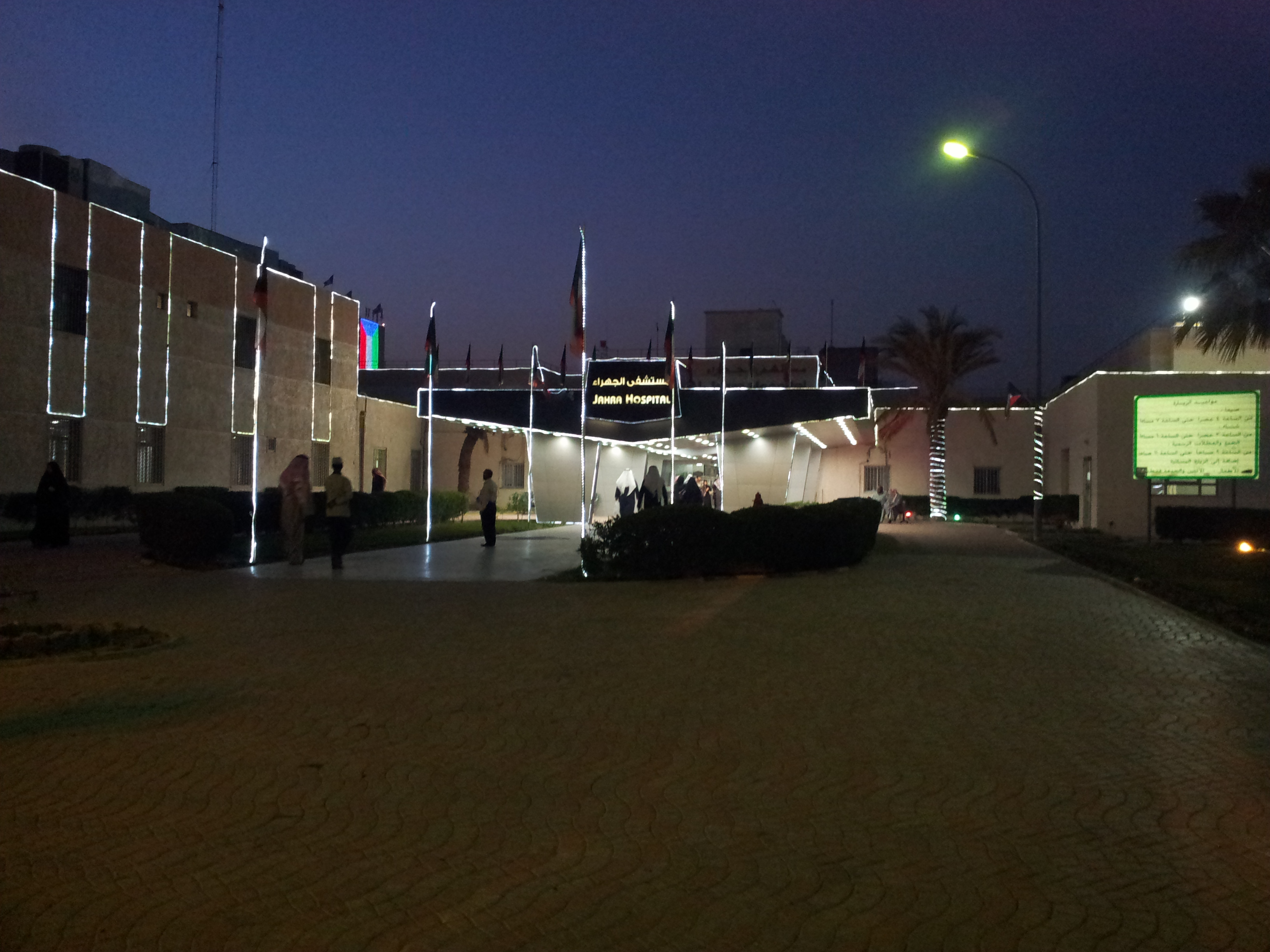
- Old Jahra Hospital gate

Geography
- Location: 8MQM+8C Jahra Governorate, Kuwait
- Coordinates: 29.338466°N 47.683507°E

Organisation
- Type: General

History
- Opened: 1981 (old hospital); 2018 (new hospital)

Links
- Lists: Hospitals in Kuwait

The Jahra Hospital (Arabic: مستشفى الجهراء) is the main public general hospital in the Jahra Governorate, Kuwait. It was first opened in 1981.

== New Jahra Hospital ==
A new integrated hospital was built next to Al-Jahra Hospital, to be a medical city serving the residents of the governorate. The medical city extends over an area of 235,000 square meters with a total building area of 724,000 square meters and contains four towers for patient rooms, one of the largest central laboratories, the largest maternity center for gynecology, and the largest accident and emergency department in Country. It has 1,903 beds and was first opened in 2018.
