= Mubarak Al-Kabeer (governorate) =

Governorate of Kuwait

Mubarak Al-Kabeer Governorate محافظة مبارك الكبير
- Governorate
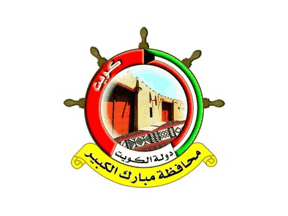
- Flag

- Map of Kuwait with Mubarak Al-Kabeer highlighted
- Coordinates (Mubarak Al-Kabeer): 29°12′44″N 48°03′38″E
- Country: Kuwait
- Established: 27 November 1999
- Areas: 13

Area
  - Total: 104 km^{2} (40 sq mi)

Population (2021)
  - Total: 279,666
  - Density: 2,690/km^{2} (6,960/sq mi)
- Time zone: UTC+03 (EAT)
- ISO 3166 code: KW-MU

Mubarak Al-Kabeer Governorate (Arabic: محافظة مبارك الكبير, romanized: Muḥāfaẓat Mubārak al-Kabīr) is one of the six governorates of Kuwait. Established in 1999, it is the newest of the governorates. It covers an area of approximately 104 km^{2} (40 sq mi) and is the second smallest governorate by land area. According to the 2021 census, it had a population of 279,666, and is the least populated governorate in the country.

== History ==
Mubarak Al-Kabeer Governorate is one of the six governorates of Kuwait. It was the last of the six to be established. It was established under Decree No. 290, and was formed officially on 27 November 1999. It was split from the Hawalli Governorate and was named after Mubarak Al-Sabah, the seventh ruler of the Sheikhdom of Kuwait.

== Geography ==
The governorate is situated along the Persian Gulf and is bordered by the governorates of Hawalli to the north, Farwaniya to the west, and Ahmadi to the south. It occupies a land area of 104 km^{2} (40 sq mi), and is the second smallest governorate by land area. It is subdivided into 13 areas–Industrial Sabhan, Sabhan Central, Sabhan South Central, Sabah Al-Salem, Al-Adan, Al-Qusour, Al-Qurain, Mubarak Al-Kabeer, Messila, Fnaitees, Abu Al-Hasania, and Abu Ftaira.

== Demographics ==
According to the 2021 census, Mubarak Al-Kabeer Governorate had a population of 279,666, comprising 141,708 males and 137,958 females. Most of the governorate is residential, and it is the least populated governorate in Kuwait. About 212,621 were aged 15 and above, of which 124,416 were married, 72,224 had never married, 10,769 were divorced and 4,500 were widowed.

About 175,744 were Kuwaiti citizens, representing approximately 62.8% of the population, while non-Kuwaiti residents were 103,922, accounting for approximately 37.2%. The Kuwaiti population consisted of 86,430 males and 89,314 females, while the non-Kuwaiti population included 55,278 males and 48,644 females. The expatriate population included 182,713 from Gulf Cooperation Council countries, 13,193 from other Arab countries, and 78,481 from other Asian countries. The remaining population included 3,195 from sub-Saharan Africa, 776 from Europe, 1,102 from North America, 153 from South America, and 53 from Oceania.

== Economy ==
Mubarak Al-Kabeer Port is located in the governorate. Mubarak Al-Kabeer Governorate had 4,996 registered establishments, of which 4,562 were in the private sector. Accommodation and food service activities accounted for the largest number of establishments, with 1,440, followed by 1,160 wholesale and retail trade establishments, and 619 pertaining to agriculture, forestry and fishing. Of the population aged 15 years and above, 141,205 were employed. Manufacturing industries was the largest employer with 68,755 people, followed by transportation and storage with 26,191 and wholesale and retail trade with 12,725.
