= List of hospitals in Kuwait =

This is the list of hospitals in Kuwait.

== Public Hospitals ==
- Al Razi Hospital
- Al Sabah Hospital
- Amiri Hospital
- Adan Hospital
- Mubarak Al-Kabeer Hospital
- Farwaniya Hospital
- Jahra Hospital
- Ibn Sina hospital (neurology, neurophysiology, Epilepsy Monitoring Unit, neurosurgery and pediatric surgery)
- Babtain burn center
- Hamad organ transplant center
- Nefesi nephrology center
- NBK Children Hospital
- Al Bahar ophthalmology center
- Kuwait Cancer Control Center (KCCC)
- Military hospital
- Al Ahmadi Hospital (For oil companies patients)
- Zain ENT Hospital
- Shaikh Salem Al-Ali Audiology Center
- Chest Diseases Hospital
- Maternity Hospital
- Psychiatry hospital
- Al-Rashed Allergy center
- Islamic medical center
- Asad Al-Hamad Skin Center
- Sabah Al Ahmad Urology Center
- Pulmonary rehabilitation center
- Kuwait heart center
- Sheikh Jaber Al-Ahmad Hospital

== See also ==
- Healthcare in Kuwait
- Health in Kuwait
