= Mubarak Al-Kabeer (area) =

Coordinates: 29°11′19″N 48°4′49″E

Mubarak Al-Kabeer City (Arabic: منطقة مبارك الكبير) is an area in Kuwait. The Mubarak Al-Kabeer governorate is named after the area. It was named after Mubarak Al-Sabah, the seventh ruler of the Sheikhdom of Kuwait, reigning from 1896 to 1915.
