= Qusour, Kuwait =

Qusūr (Arabic: القصور, romanized: palaces) is an area in Kuwait City, located in the Mubarak Al-Kabeer Governorate in Kuwait.
