= Health in Kuwait =

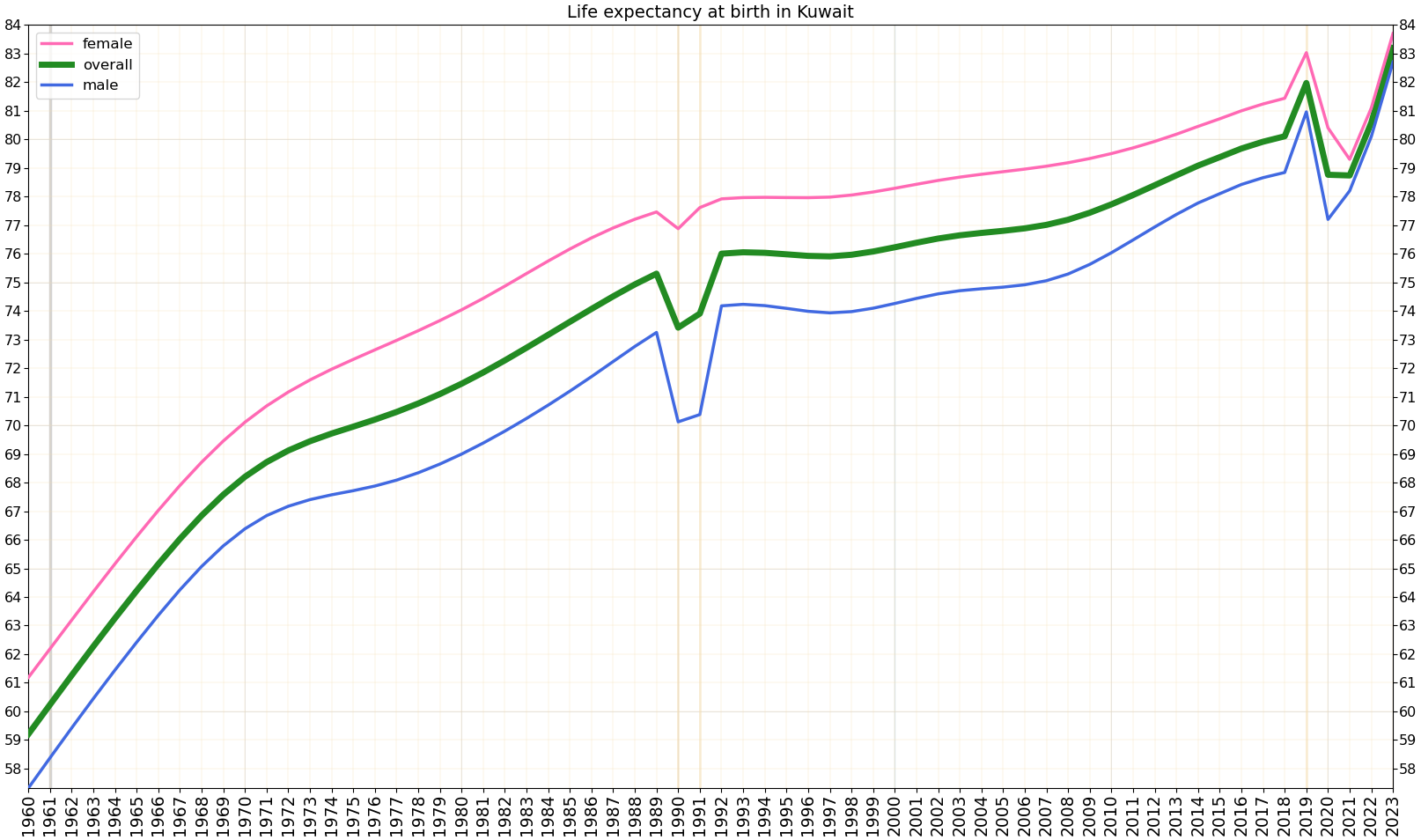
Life expectancy in Kuwait

In Kuwait, life expectancy at birth in 2013 was 78 years for men and 79 years for women.

== Infrastructure ==
As part of Kuwait Vision 2035, many new hospitals have opened. In the years leading up to the COVID-19 pandemic, Kuwait invested in its health care system at a rate that was proportionally higher than most other GCC countries. As a result, the public hospital sector significantly increased its capacity. Kuwait currently has 20 public hospitals. The new Sheikh Jaber Al-Ahmad Hospital is considered the largest hospital in the Middle East. Kuwait also has 16 private hospitals.

== Obesity ==
Prevalence of obesity in the adult population, top countries (2016), Kuwait has the ninth highest rate in the world.

Obesity is a growing health concern in Kuwait. According to Forbes magazine, Kuwait ranked 8 on a 2007 list of fattest countries with around 74.2% of Kuwait's total population with an unhealthy weight. In 2011, the number of bariatric operations in Kuwait was 5,000.

From 1980 to 1993, the percentage of individuals age 18–29 that were overweight rose from 30.6% to 54.4% and the percentage of those who were overweight increased from 12.8% to 24.6%. In 2000, it was determined that amongst children age 10–14, 30% of boys and 31.8% of girls were overweight.

According to the Dasman Center for Research and Treatment of Diabetes, 15% of the adult population has diabetes, with 50% of adults over 45 living with the disease. 22 of every 100 children have developed diabetes as a result of an unhealthy weight.

Advertisements for unhealthy junk food are common and some schools sell candy, chocolate, and soda to their students. Specifically in Kuwaiti universities, other factors include eating between meals, marital status, and a male domination of sports.

== Smoking ==
A smoking ban in public places was introduced by Law No 15 of 1995 but was not strictly enforced. New regulations were introduced in 2015 which banned the smoking of indoor public places.

Smoking while driving is considered one of the major causes of accidents. In 2015, the General Traffic Department considered enforcing the law that bans motorists smoking inside their vehicles while driving.

== See also ==
- Healthcare in Kuwait
- List of hospitals in Kuwait
