= Mubarak Al-Kabeer Hospital =

- Ministry of Health in Kuwait

Geography
- Location: Jabriya, Kuwait
- Coordinates: 29.326223°N 48.034989°E

History
- Opened: 1982

Links
- Website: www.moh.gov.kw
- Lists: Hospitals in Kuwait

Mubarak Al-Kabeer Hospital (Arabic: مستشفى مبارك الكبير) is a general hospital opened in Jabriya, Kuwait in 1982, operating under the Ministry of Health. The hospital was named after Shiekh Mubarak Al-Kabeer Al-Sabah. It serves the Hawalli Governorate providing healthcare services to approximately 700,000 people. The hospital offers a range of medical departments and services, and provides healthcare to residents of Kuwait of all nationalities. Patients who come to the hospital are required to present their CIVIL ID CARD. The hospital is affiliated with Kuwait University's Faculty of Medicine.

== History ==
Mubarak Al-Kabeer Hospital was opened in 1982. It was named in honour of Sheikh Mubarak Al-Sabah, known as Mubarak the Great, who ruled Kuwait from 1896 to 1915.

On 25 October 2010, a four-storey extension, containing 236 beds was inaugurated, increasing the hospital's capacity from 545 to 781 beds. The project cost approximately 8.1 million kuwaiti dinars and included eight warsds within a building covering 16,300 square metres.

In December 2012, the Ministry of Health launched a project to renovate and expand the hospital's surgical facilities, with plans to increase the number of operating rooms to ten at a cost of KD3.1 million. The upgrades included video communication systems intended to allow medical students to observe operations and communicate with surgeons during procedures.

In March 2014, renovated intensive care units for adult cardiac patients and children were inaugurated at the hospital. The cardiac unit provided 15 beds, while the paediatric intensive care unit contained ten beds, including 2 isoluation rooms.

The hospital opened an electronic pharmacy on 11 January 2015. In September 2018, a cardiac catheterisation ward was inaugurated, incorporating facilities for surgery, cardiovascular physiology and cardiac catheterisation. The development expanded the hospital's cardiovascular services and was intended to reduce referrals to other specialist hospitals.

A three-storey car park opened in January 2021, alongside renovations to the hospital's emergency entrance and other departments. Plans were also announced for eight additional physiotherapy and psychiatry clinics.

In August 2025, Kuwait's Cabinet reviewed proposals to expand Mubarak Al-Kabeer Hospital and improve its operational efficiency as part of wider plans to develop the country's healthcare infrastructure.
