= Bayan, Kuwait =

Residential area in Kuwait

Coordinates: 29°19′N 48°02′E

Bayan (Arabic: بيان) is a residential area and district in the Hawalli Governorate of Kuwait, consisting of 13 blocks, and situated approximately 15 kilometres away from the core areas of Kuwait City. Its naming was inspired by the fact that it is in an area of higher altitude in comparison to its surrounding Mishref, Salwa, and Rumaithiya. The Kuwaiti Government headquarters are located in Bayan Palace which houses its own mosque and gardens within its walls. Beside it, the main skyline feature one group of Kuwait Water Towers (known for their white-and-blue vertical stripes and long mushroom form), as nine of them are arranged in a diamond shape. Its area is 4,300,000 m^{2}.

Bayan also houses several international embassies, including that of the United States, Belgium, and Thailand.
