= Kuwait Zoo =

- Interactive map of Kuwait Zoo
- 29.300167°N 47.962450°E
- Location: Omariya, Kuwait
- Land area: 18 ha (44 acres)

Kuwait Zoo is a zoo located in Omariya in Kuwait. It has officially closed on The 12th of March 2020 due to precautions of Covid 19.

== History ==
Kuwait Zoo was established in 1968. The zoo suffered extensive damages during the 1990 Iraqi Invasion. Nevertheless, most of the maintenance work has been finished, and the zoo reopened after the modification and renovation work was completed. Part of these renovations in early 1993 included the addition of new animals from other zoos. The zoo is around 180,000 m^{2} in area. It is divided into four major sections:

- Animal Section
- Cultural Center and Life Sciences Division
- Services and Maintenance section
- Veterinary clinic.

== Breeding and Over Population ==
Kuwait Zoo does not use any device preventing fertilization or sterilization that regulates undesirable reproduction. Most cases, separating the animals in different cages are the only method zoo so far chosen to use as a preventive method to downgrade mating chances. Zoo faces harsh criticism since this old fashion in breeding system leads populace in zoo which force them to sell certain categories (mostly pony, deer, sheep and peacock) of animals for public.

== PETA criticism ==
PETA Asia director, Jason Baker said that the living conditions of the Kuwait Zoo animals are atrocious and that they are continuously suffering a miserable life. In a letter addressed to the Director General of Kuwait Environment Public Authority, Baker urged the director to immediately ban the import of anymore animals to the zoo. According to the People for Ethical Treatment of Animals (PETA) activist, several animals at the Kuwait Zoo have died due to severe neglect on part of the employees as well as "...despicable husbandry conditions and the absence of veterinary care." "The situation has been exacerbated by the recent heat waves in the country. Without adequate shelter and water, numerous animals have died of dehydration and heatstroke after prolonged exposure to extreme heat. News reports indicate that animals such as parrots, dogs and deer were lying dead at the zoo," he said. Baker added that the zoo workers had no skills or knowledge when it came to providing proper treatment to injured and sick animals. He respectfully urged the Environment Public Authority to immediately ban any further import of animals and to take measures to improve the animal welfare at the zoo. The PETA director also mentioned that Kuwait ratified the Convention on International Trade in Endangered Species of Wild Fauna and Flora in 2002 and various animals that have died were protected under the convention. He implored the authority to observe the treaty obligations and investigate the managerial activities of the Kuwait Zoo as well as to prohibit anyone from trading animals in violation of the convention.

Director of Kuwait Zoo has refuted the assertions made by PETA Asia Director, Jason Baker saying that The Board of Director believes that Mr. Baker’s opinions and concerns only through a piece of article published a month ago that is full of unsubstantiated remarks. (The article was written by Mr. Fahed Al-Mayah of Al-Rai - Kuwait Newspaper) The Director said that the way the artifact was inscribed in an unethical and predisposed way. In the article, the writer claimed that "...there isn’t any air conditioning in the indoor animal enclosures and that they are dying due to the summer power cuts, which is untrue."

== Transfer of Zoo ==
The idea of transferring the Zoo to an alternate place in Al-Mutlaa area is considering but sources revealed that the Council has yet to discuss the situation of the Zoo, although members have presented proposals supporting the idea.

== Gallery ==
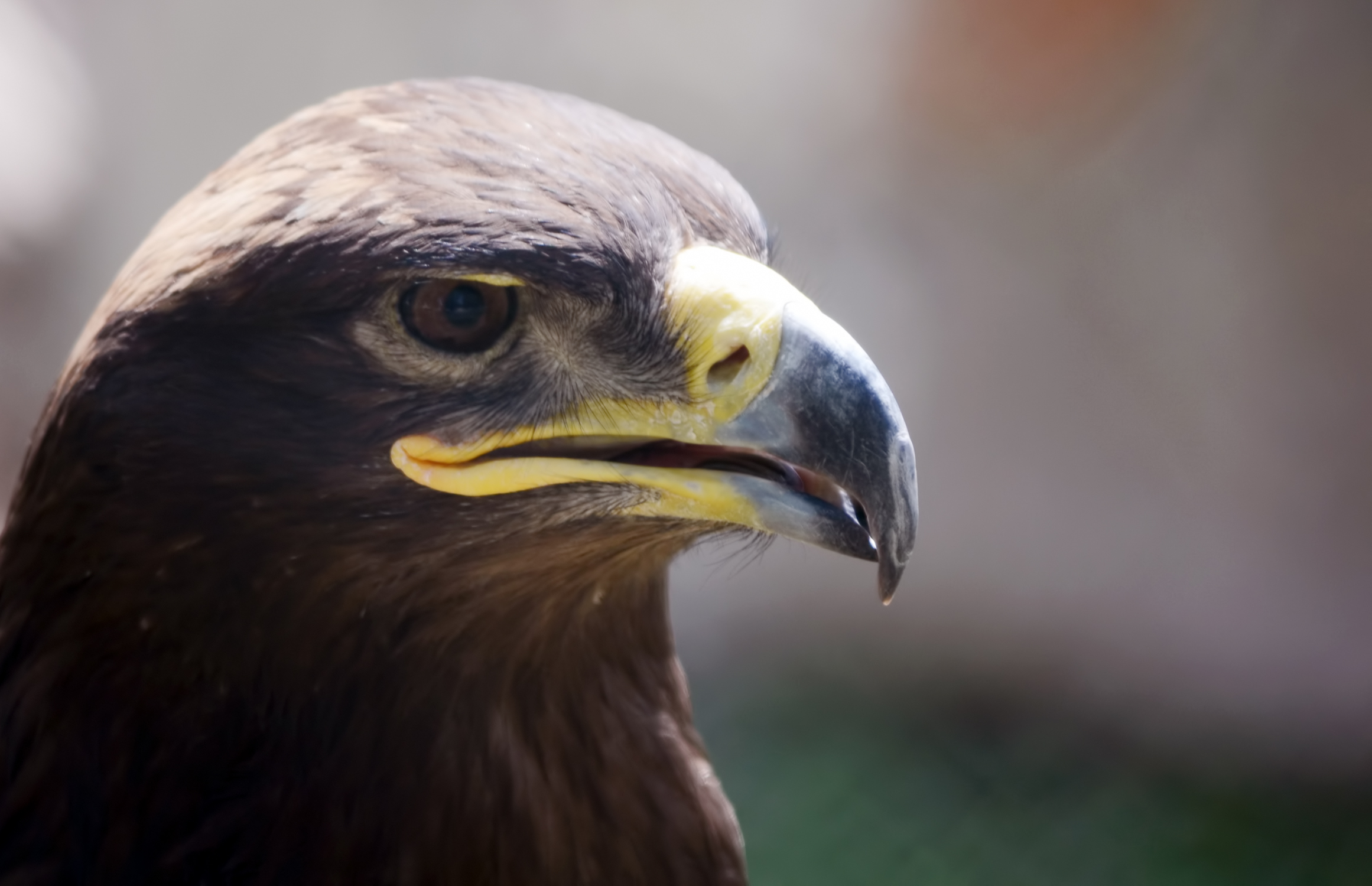
Golden eagle

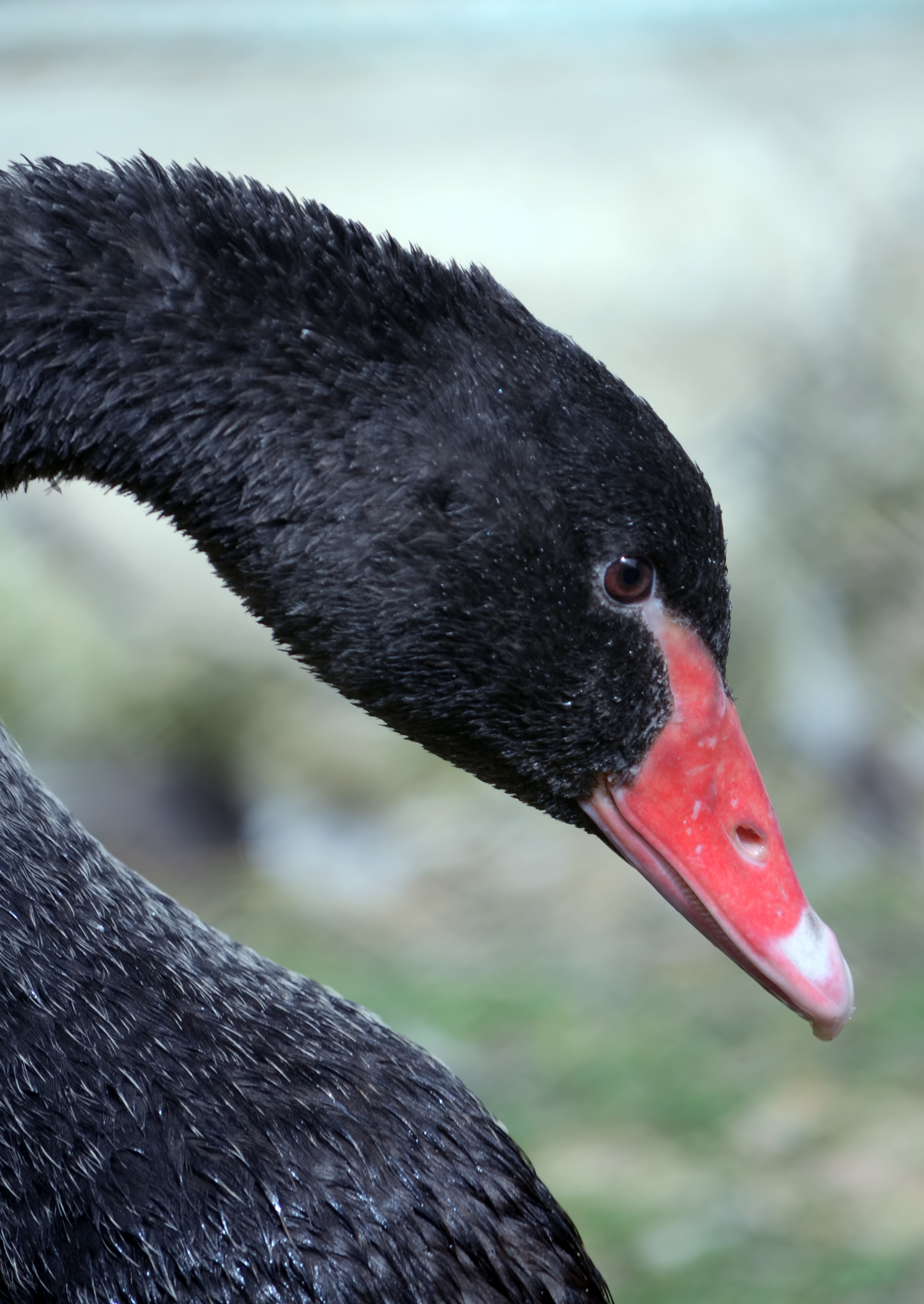
Black swan

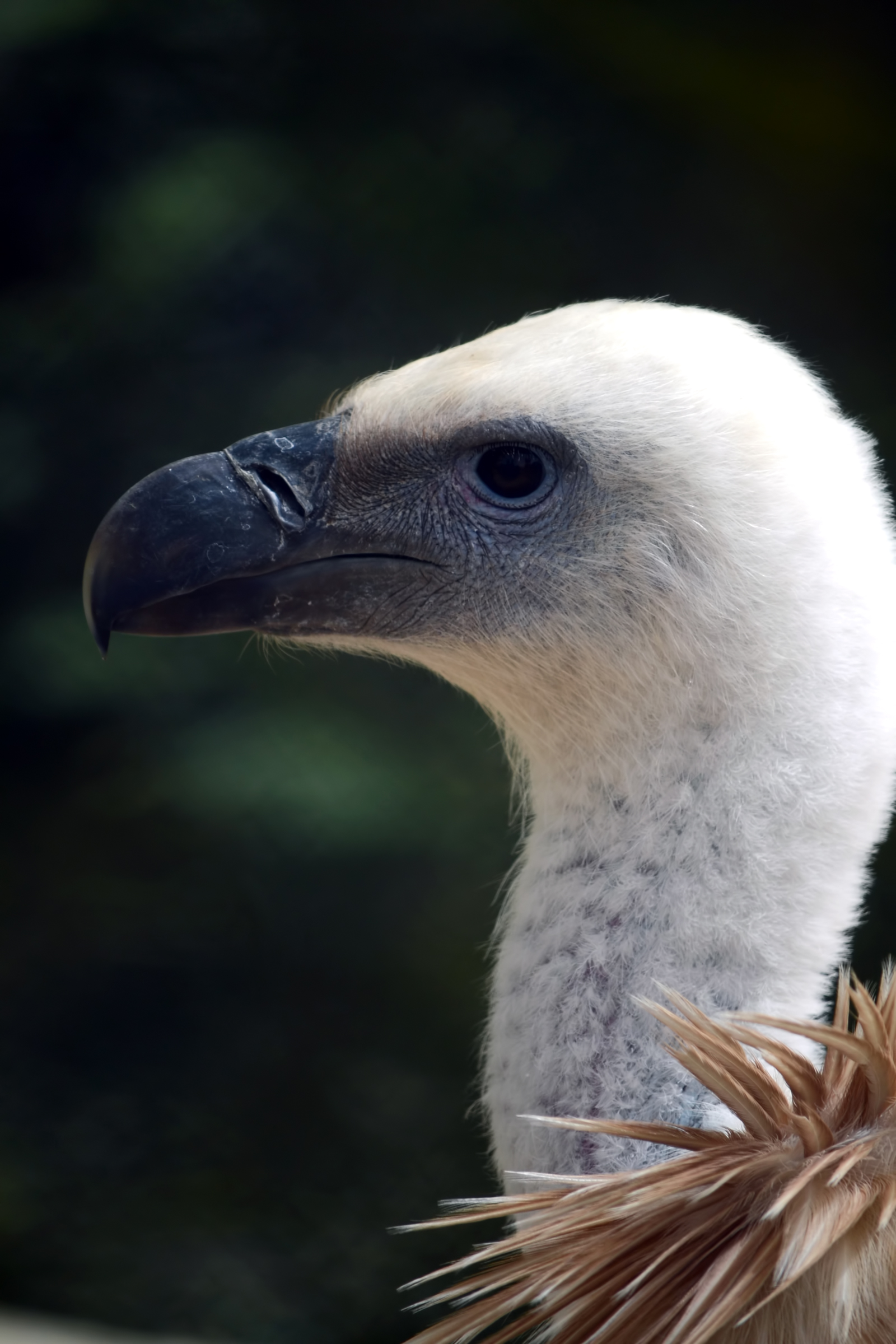
Griffon vulture

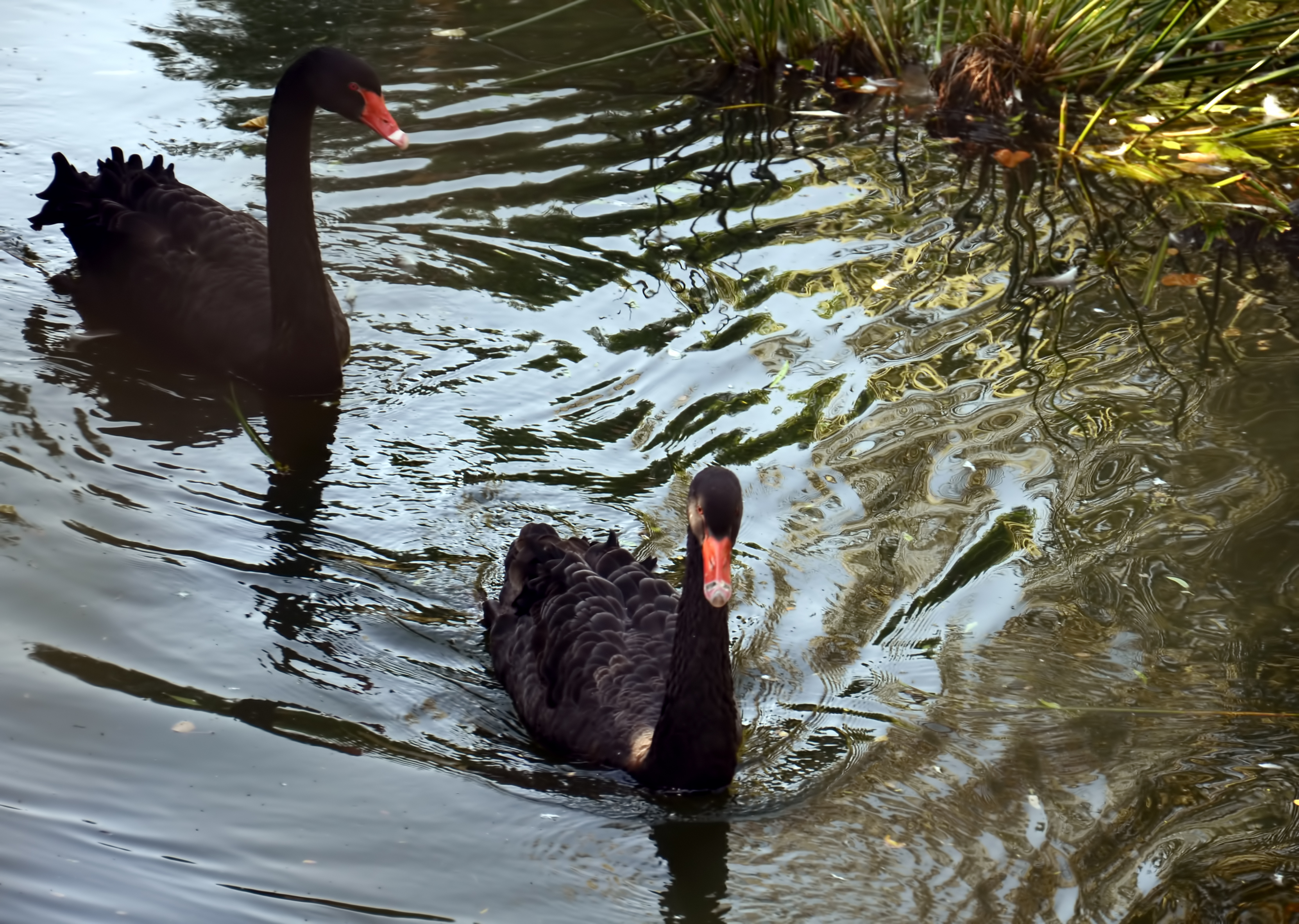
Black swan

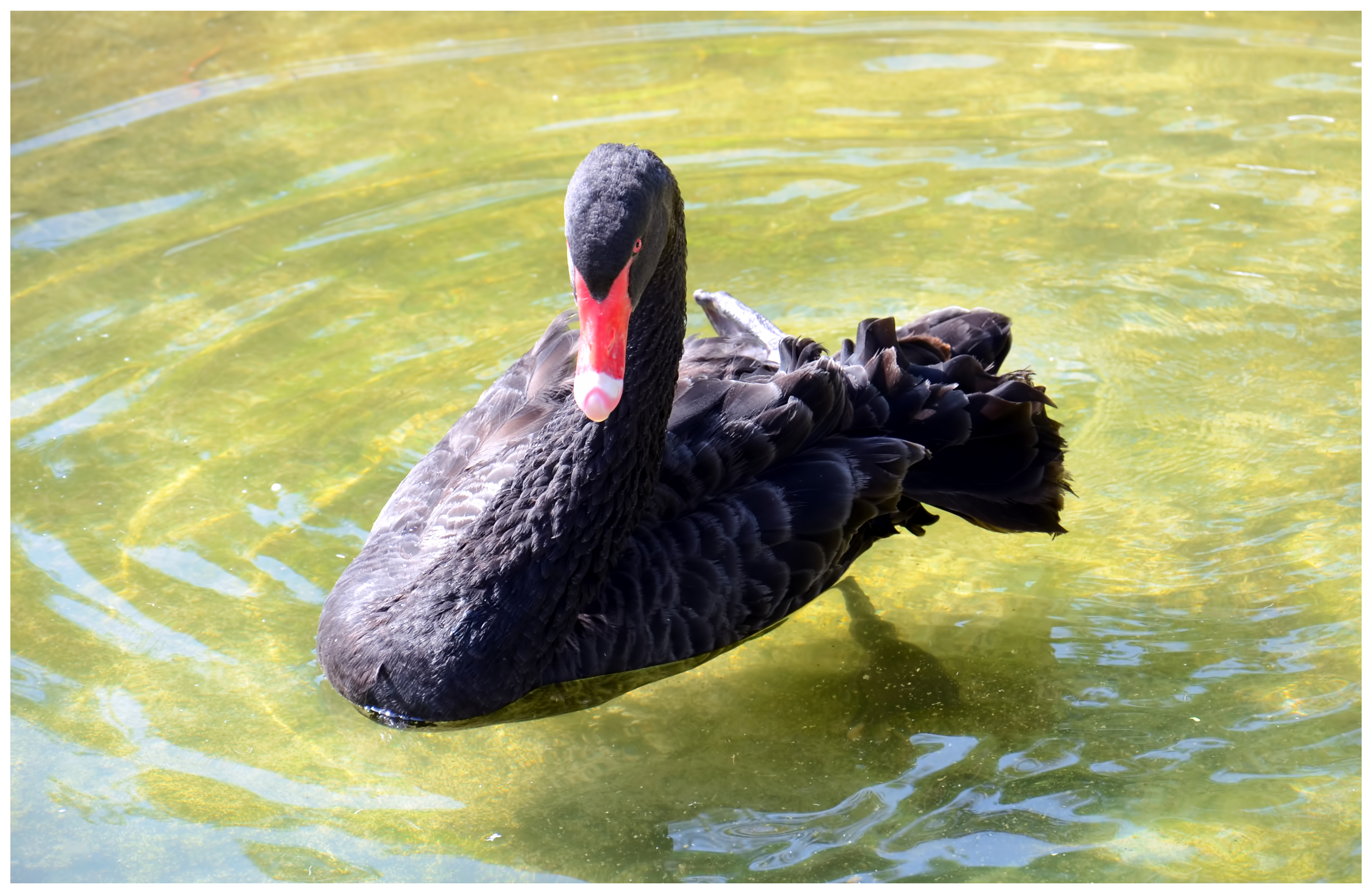
Black swan
