= Tareq Rajab Museum =

Islamic art museum in Kuwait

- Established: 1980
- Location: Street 5, Building 22, Block 12, Jabriya, Kuwait
- Coordinates: 29°19′1.2″N 48°2′49.94″E
- Type: Islamic Art Museum
- Collection size: 30,000+
- Founders: Tareq S. Rajab & Jehan S. Rajab

The Tareq Rajab Museum (Arabic: متحف طارق رجب) is located in Kuwait and houses an extensive collection of artefacts accumulated over a fifty-year period commencing in the 1950s. The Museum is housed at two separate locations in Jabriya, Kuwait: the Tareq Rajab Museum, which was founded in 1980, and the Tareq Rajab Museum of Islamic Calligraphy in 2007. The Tareq Rajab Museum includes collections of manuscripts and miniatures, ceramics, metalwork, glass, arms and armour as well as textiles, costumes and jewellery. The museum's ceramics collection is very large and comprehensive, and includes objects from pre-Islamic times up to the early 20th century and from across the breadth of the Islamic world. The museum houses one of the foremost collections of silver jewellery as well as a fine collection of gold jewellery much of which dates from pre-Islamic times. There is a large collection of Qurans and manuscripts from all periods, with the earliest dating to the 7th century AD and from across the whole Islamic world. From important Qurans, to rare manuscripts such as the Al-Kindi book on optics and a folio from the Shahnameh of Shah Tahmasp, the range of works is comprehensive and representative of many styles and regions.

The Tareq Rajab Museum is fully funded by the Rajab family and today, the third generation of the family are actively involved with its operations and management.

== History ==
=== The collection ===
Tareq Al-Sayid Rajab's journey into collecting began with a trip to Baghdad as a fourteen-year-old boy in the 1940s, which then progressed to book and manuscript collecting in England during the 1950s. As a student, he received a weekly allowance from Kuwait's Educational Office in London, which he spent largely on books. The Educational Office was very supportive, often reimbursing him for book purchases without question, considering them educational. By the 1960s, Tareq and his wife Jehan had travelled extensively by car around the Middle East, sometimes even driving to England. When they spent a year in Denmark, they also made the journey by car. During these long journeys, they started collecting items from dealers in cities such as Damascus and Istanbul, as well as from remote villages in Syria, Palestine, and Iran. Jehan, with her anthropological interest in people and cultures, played a significant role in these efforts.

The aim of these trips was not only to enjoy themselves but also to photograph and collect cultural artefacts to help preserve aspects of various cultures being lost to rapid modernisation. In those days, modern road systems in many countries they visited had not been built, so Tareq and Jehan often drove across rough roads, through mountains, and camped beside villages and tribes. They would meet the local people and often managed to buy artefacts directly from them. In the 1960s, Istanbul was not as touristic as it is today, allowing them to find many interesting objects, especially ethnic items, which few people were interested in at the time.

The idea to build a museum of Islamic art originated with Tareq Rajab during his tenure as the Kuwait's Director of Museums and Antiquities in the 1960s, then a branch of the Ministry of Education. Despite his repeated proposals and ideas, there was little interest from his superiors and no budget allocated for such a project. However, Tareq had developed a genuine interest in the arts of the Islamic world, and by the early 1970s, he began collecting seriously, transitioning from a hobbyist to a dedicated collector. With the New English School firmly established, Tareq had more time to travel and attend auctions in London. He acquired items from auction houses such as Sotheby's, Christie's, Bonhams, and others. In the 1970s, it was very much a buyer's market, long before buyers from the Gulf took an interest. Tareq also attended sales in old British stately homes, purchasing artefacts such as manuscripts, ceramics, metalwork, and glass. His growing reputation in the market led several dealers to approach him, enabling him to acquire numerous interesting artefacts, including the enamelled jewels of the Sultan of Bukhara, which are currently on display.

Initially, Tareq focused on ceramics, manuscripts, metalwork, and glass. By the mid-1970s, he had amassed a sizeable collection and displayed most of the objects in his house. It was at this point that he began to seriously consider establishing a museum to share his collection with the public. At that time, Kuwait had very few educational resources on the artistic history of the Islamic world. One of Tareq's objectives was to create a venue where people living in and visiting Kuwait could learn about this rich heritage. Tareq decided to house the museum in a villa he owned in Jabriya, near the New English School. The museum remains in this location to this day. Work on the museum began in the late 1970s, and by 1980, it was formally established and inaugurated, becoming the first Islamic Art museum in Kuwait and the entire Gulf region.

=== Iraqi Invasion and Occupation of Kuwait (1990-1991) ===
The Iraqi invasion and occupation of Kuwait commenced in the early morning of August 2, 1990. At the time, Tareq Rajab was in Jordan, and his two eldest children, Nur and Ziad, were traveling abroad. His wife, Jehan, and their youngest son, Nader, remained in Kuwait throughout the occupation. The invasion took many Kuwaitis by surprise; Jehan first became aware of the situation upon being awakened by the sounds of explosions, sustained gunfire, and Iraqi helicopters overhead. On the first day of the occupation, she managed to contact her daughter Nur and her husband Tareq, but soon after, international telephone lines were cut, severing their communication with the outside world for over seven months. However, Kuwait's internal telephone lines remained operational, allowing news to spread quickly within the country.

Aware of the need to protect the family's museum, which was fortunately situated below ground level, Jehan and Nader decided to secure and conceal it. They bolted the museum's heavy carved Indian doors, removed identifying signs, and descended into the museum to safeguard its exhibits. Priority was given to packing and hiding valuable manuscripts and ceramics. Many maintenance workers from the nearby New English School, despite attempts to flee Kuwait, stayed to assist Jehan and Nader in their efforts, which were described as "frantic though purposeful." A guard was stationed upstairs to warn of any intrusions. Jehan contacted Tareq's foreman, Nasser, to arrange for carpenters and builders to assist immediately. During the packing process, a small 19th-century grain of rice inscribed with verses from the Qur’an was so well concealed that it remains lost to this day. Meanwhile, Tareq remained in Amman for a short time, overseeing the New English School he had opened there and writing letters to Jehan, which were smuggled into Kuwait by one of his Palestinian drivers who could travel between Jordan and Kuwait.

Within a few days, the left side of the museum was filled with packed boxes, suitcases, and bags, while the showcases were emptied. These items were hidden in side rooms and a large space behind one of the bigger showcases, then blocked off and concealed. Doors were bolted shut, and carpenters used sheets of wood to seal them, painting over the wood to match the walls. David Roberts lithographs, considered of little interest to Iraqi soldiers, were hung on the false walls to complete the disguise. By the end of the occupation, Iraqi soldiers had forced open and ransacked every cupboard and drawer in the nearby New English School, leaving none unbroken.

With the manuscripts and ceramics secured, attention turned to the thousands of pieces of jewellery, costumes, textiles, embroideries, and stringed instruments on the opposite side. As most helpers had left Kuwait or could not reach the museum, Jehan, Nader, Rawa Adawa, and Nasser managed this task. They decided to completely block off that section and pretend it did not exist. The Gold Room in this area was further sealed off and hidden; the marks from the false wall are still visible today. The museum was secured, and the Rajab's awaited the Iraqi arrival. The New English School, being large and prominent, was seized by the Iraqi army and used as a base. Pillboxes and anti-aircraft weaponry were installed on the roof, causing significant disturbances in the neighborhood when fired. The school's stores contained between three and five hundred hand-woven Iraqi carpets, collected by Tareq and Jehan from the Marsh Arabs of southern Iraq. This entire collection was stolen and destroyed during the occupation, with some remnants found around the school after liberation.

Their home was searched multiple times, and Iraqi soldiers attempted to rob them on several occasions. As the end of the occupation approached, Jehan and Nader's efforts to hide the museum seemed successful. However, just before the ground war began, Iraqi secret police and army personnel arrived at their home, blocking the road with a machine gun-mounted vehicle. After conducting another search of the house, the secret police demanded that Nader show them the basement, where they seemed to know the museum was located. They forced their way in but were primarily searching for arms and munitions. Satisfied with Nader's explanations regarding the jewellery's lack of value, they left, taking only two cartons of cigarettes and three cassette tapes. Although they promised to return the following day, the onset of the ground war, leading to Kuwait's liberation, prevented their return.

The timely start of the ground war meant that Iraqi soldiers and secret police did not have the opportunity to revisit the museum. While much of the collection was preserved, the destruction of the Iraqi carpets and the looting of the New English School represented significant losses for the Rajab family.

=== Post invasion and present day ===
After Kuwait's liberation in 1991, Jehan Rajab was approached by the French Foreign Legion, who requested to use the New English School as their headquarters in Kuwait. Together, they re-equipped and staffed the school, successfully reopening its doors in the autumn.

During the school's use as a base, Jehan interacted with many military personnel, including members of the American Army. She met Colonel Jeffrey Greenhut, an American officer tasked with evaluating damage to cultural sites around Kuwait, including the museum. Colonel Greenhut's unit assisted in reopening the false walls around the museum and provided generators for electricity. Jehan developed a good rapport with him, and he invited her to fly to Failaka Island on an American helicopter. Failaka had always held a special place in her heart, and seeing the destruction wrought by the Iraqi army on the island and throughout Kuwait deeply saddened her. The cultural devastation and the uprooting of an entire community, which had lived there for centuries, was particularly painful.

After Kuwait's liberation, the Hungarian government appointed Géza Fehérvári, a British citizen of Hungarian origin, as ambassador to Kuwait and Riyadh. Géza, a professor of Islamic Art and Archaeology at the University of London (SOAS), was a frequent visitor to the museum and had developed a close relationship with Tareq Rajab, becoming the museums first curator.

== Collections ==
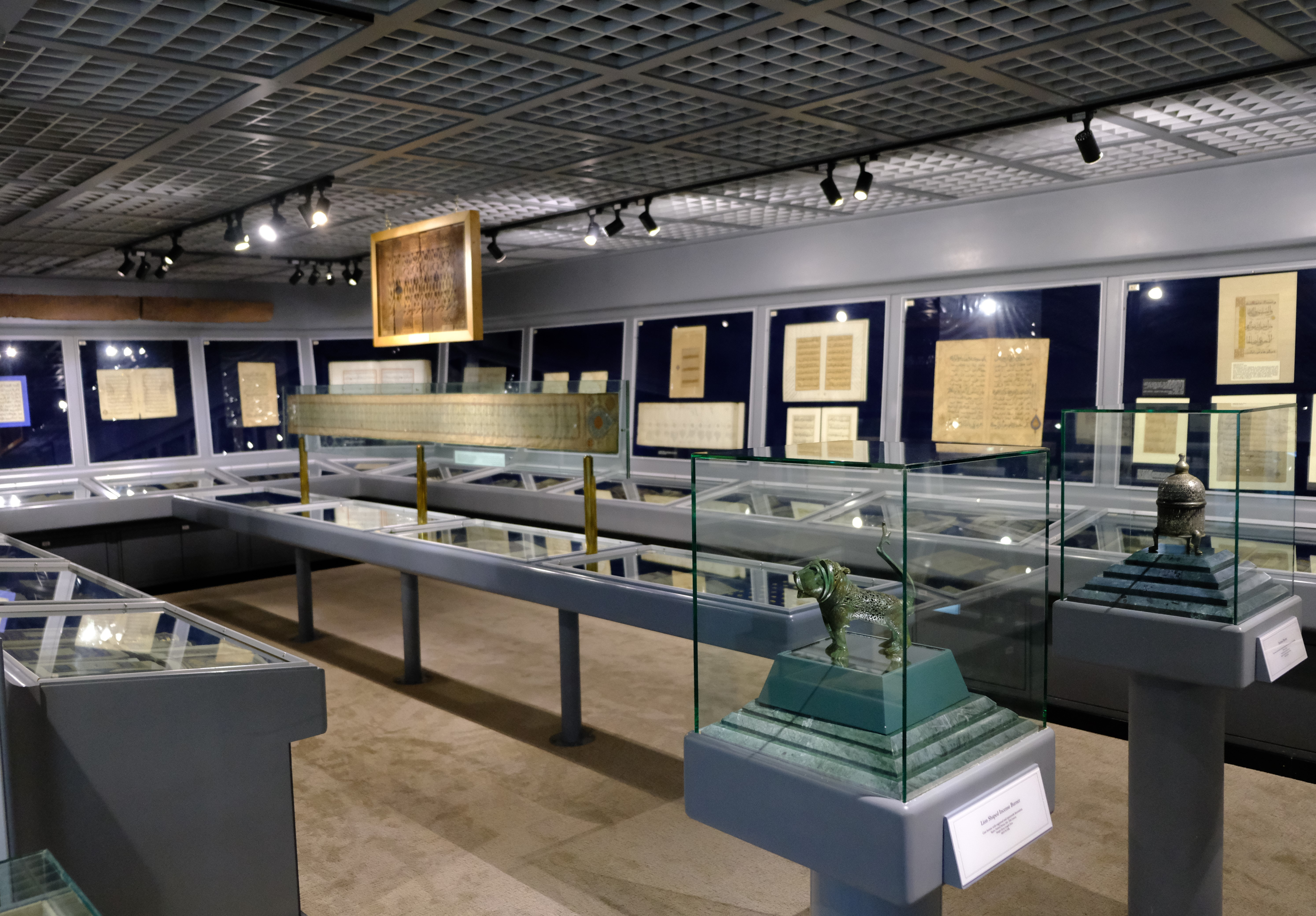
Manuscripts on Display

=== Manuscripts and calligraphy ===
The Tareq Rajab Museum houses a very large and significant collection of Qur'ans and manuscripts from various periods and regions across the Islamic world.

Some of the earliest examples in the museum include a 7th-century 'Ma'il' Script folio from Hijaz, modern-day Saudi Arabia, and 9th-century Qur'ans written on vellum from North and East Africa. The museum also houses what is believed to be the only known complete and dated Qur'an written in Kufic script, from AD 1002. On display are also Qur'ans written in China and a number of interesting and very large Indonesian Qur'ans written on palm leaves, which are on display at the Tareq Rajab Museum of Islamic Calligraphy. Also on display at the Calligraphy museum, are a large number of Hilya. In addition to religious texts, the museum displays significant manuscripts by great philosophers and scientists such as Qusta ibn Luqa al-Ba'albaki and Ya'qub Ibn Ishaq Al-Kindi.

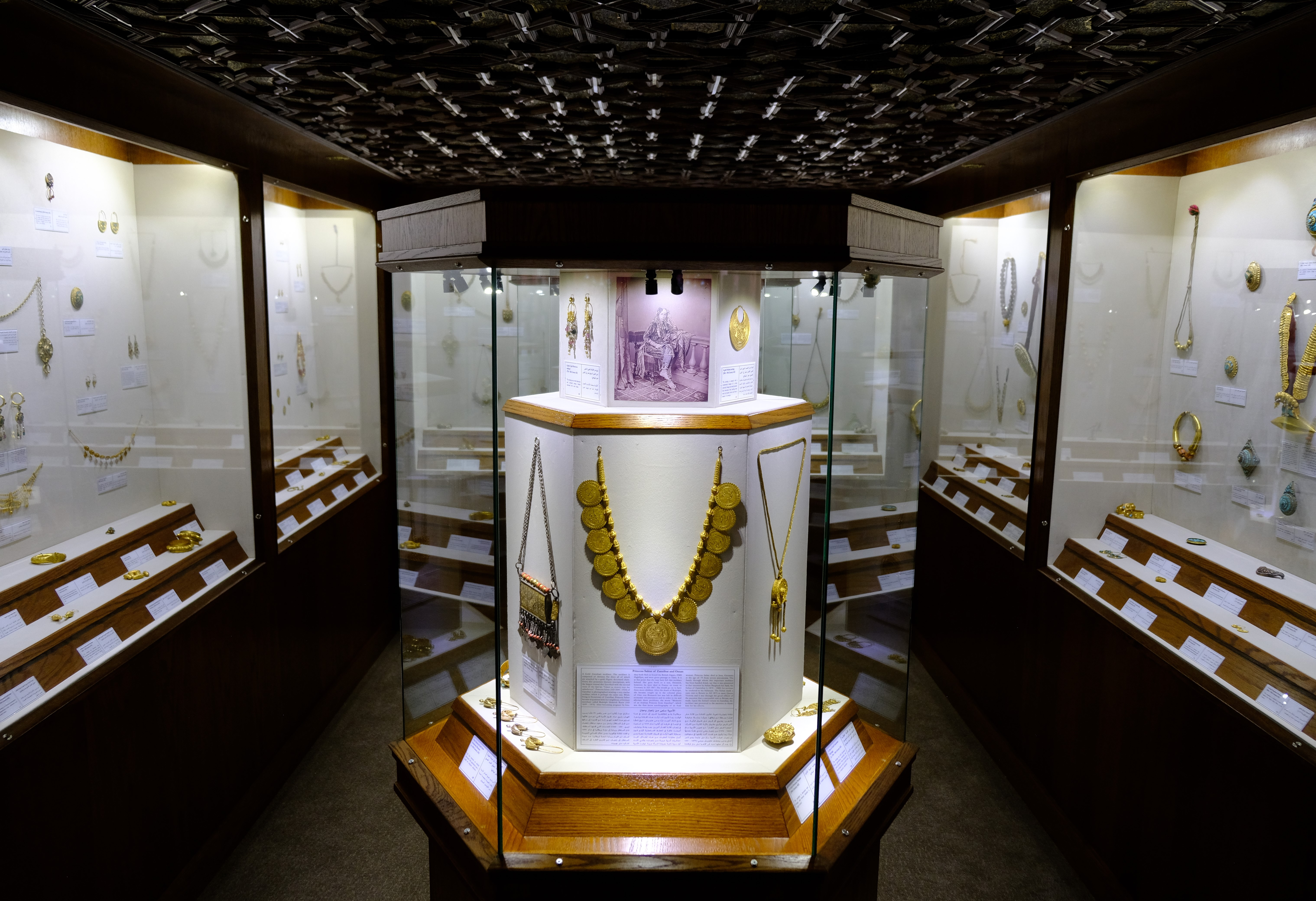
The Gold Room

=== The Gold Room ===
Since the 1980s, the "Gold Room" at the Tareq Rajab Museum has showcased the Rajab family's collection of gold jewellery. This display includes gold jewellery from pre-Islamic Arabia, the medieval period, Mughal India, the Indian subcontinent, Tibet, and Nepal. The collection features several significant items, such as a Fatimid gold bracelet, a head ornament once owned by the Mughal Emperor Humayun, a necklace belonging to Princess Salme of Zanzibar and Oman, and a necklace of the Living Goddess.

The Gold Room has its own unique history. During the Iraqi invasion of Kuwait in 1990, the collection was hidden behind a false wall, preventing its discovery by Iraqi soldiers and secret police who had found the museum just before the ground war began. After Kuwait's liberation, the Gold Room was reopened by the 352nd Civil Affairs Command

=== Ceramics ===
The Tareq Rajab Museum's ceramics collection is one of its highlights, featuring an extensive array of objects from all periods and regions of the Islamic world. This collection provides a comprehensive overview of the development of ceramic art in Islamic cultures, showcasing pieces that reflect both utilitarian functions and artistic excellence.

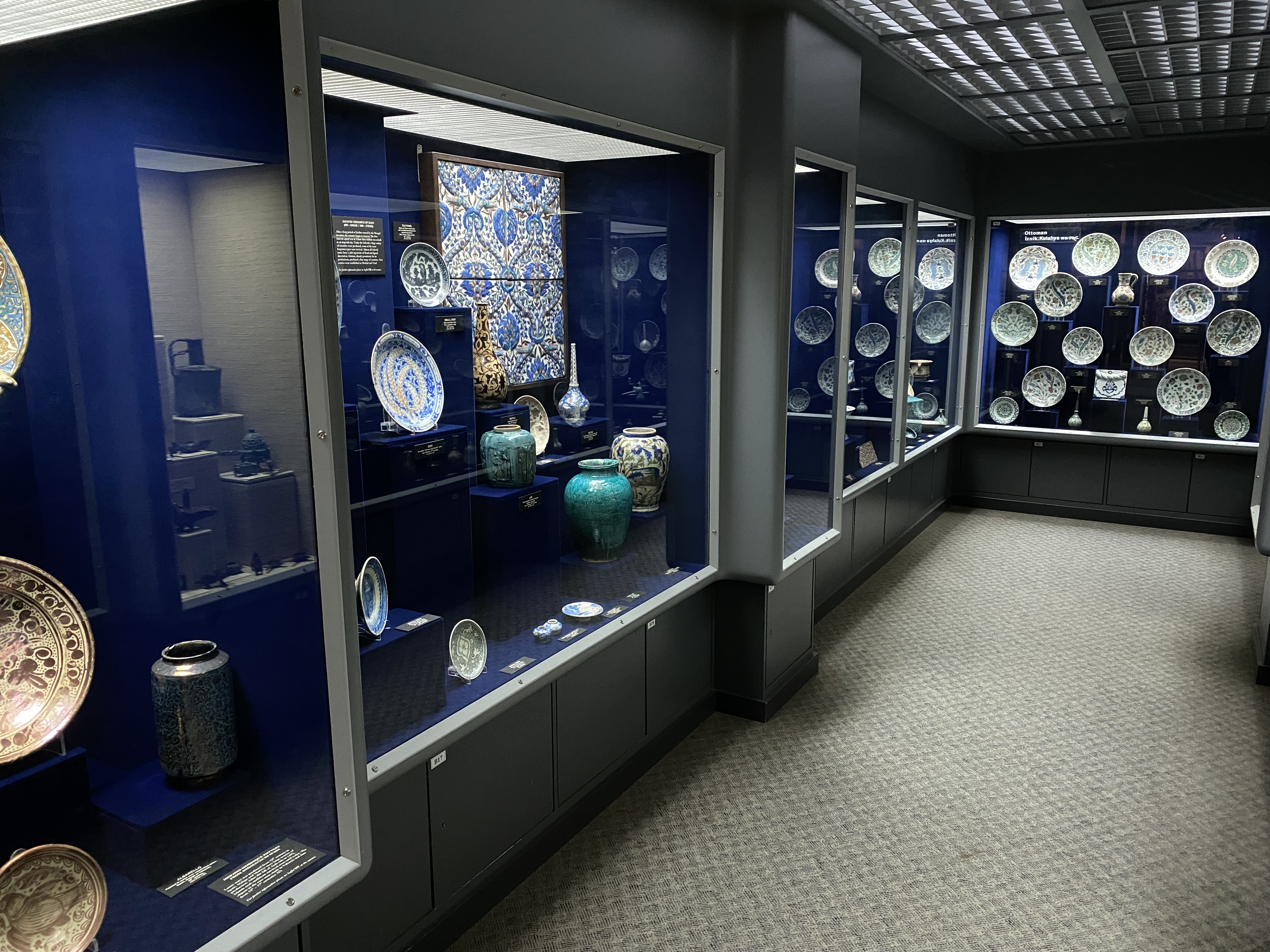
Ceramics on Display

Some of the earliest examples in the collection include pre-Islamic monochrome glazed amphorae and jars from Syria or Iran, dating back to the Parthian period. These pieces are notable for their simplicity and historical significance, offering insights into the early stages of ceramic craftsmanship in the region. The Islamic ceramic collection spans several key periods. From the Umayyad period, there are early Islamic ceramics that demonstrate the initial fusion of Islamic and pre-Islamic artistic traditions. The collection also includes lead-glazed relief wares from the Abbasid period, which are distinguished by their intricate designs and innovative glazing techniques.

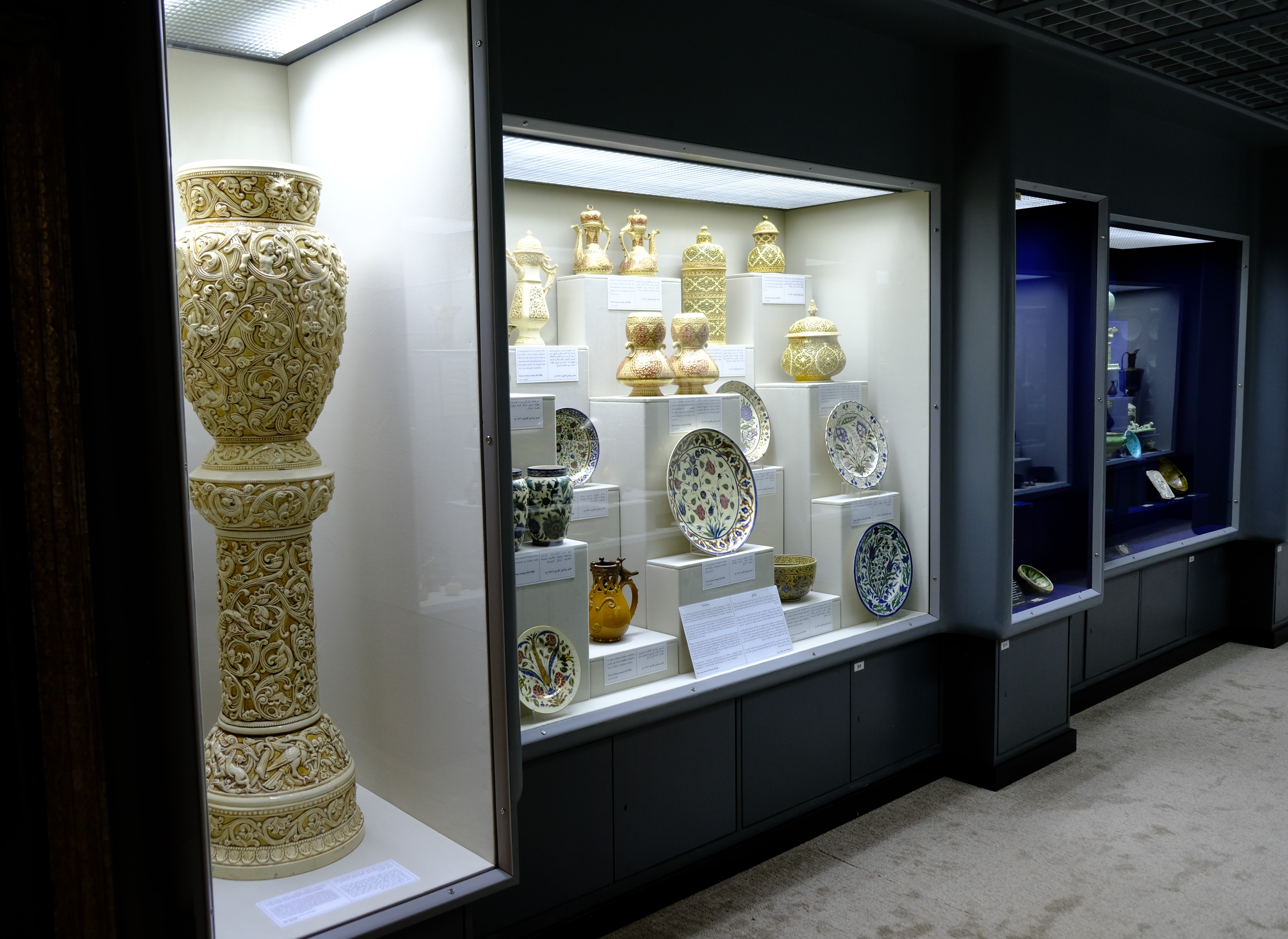
Zsolnay on Display

Further enriching the collection are ceramics from the sgraffito tradition, originating from Egypt, Syria, Iran, and Central Asia. These pieces are characterised by their distinctive scratched designs, revealing contrasting colours beneath the surface glaze. The collection also includes exquisite Timurid ceramics, known for their elaborate decoration and vibrant colours, Iznik ware and Safavid and Qajar tilework and pottery. The museum aims to illustrate the evolution of Islamic pottery, tracing the development from the early, closely related Umayyad and Abbasid examples to the later, more intricate and colourful pieces such as Iznik tiles. This progression highlights the increasing sophistication and regional diversification of Islamic ceramic art.

Adding to the diversity of the collection are Islamic-influenced Hungarian Zsolnay ceramics from the 19th century, part of the extensive collection of Denise Rajab.

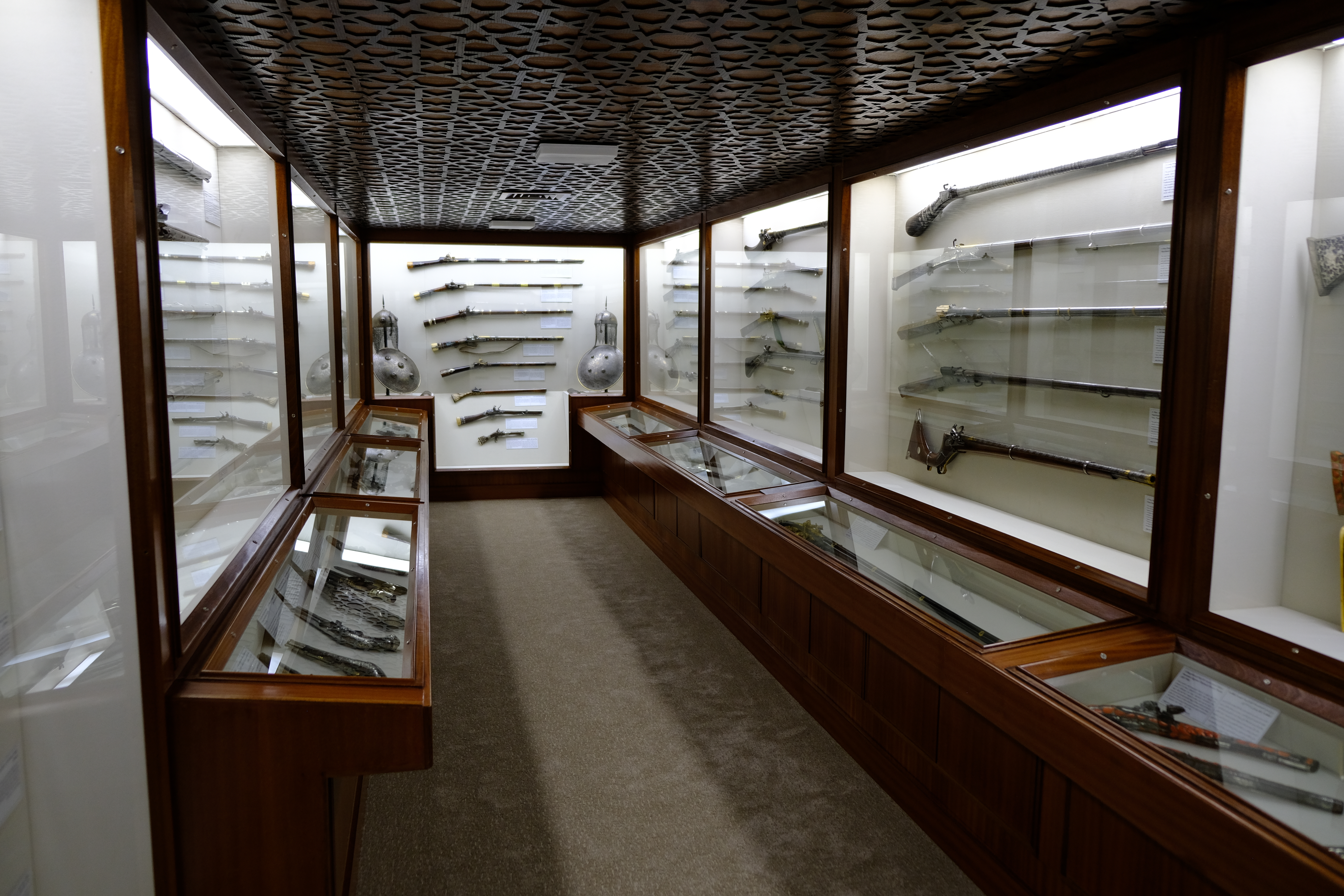
The Firearms Display

=== Arms and armour ===
The Tareq Rajab Museum houses an extensive collection of arms and armour from across the Islamic world. Before the museum's opening in 1980, the Rajab family's collection was primarily focused on the Arabian Peninsula. However, it quickly expanded to include various forms from throughout the Islamic world. By the late 1990s, the museum began displaying a diverse collection of firearms, gunpowder flasks, swords, daggers, axes, and armour.

The firearms collection today is one of the most important collections of Islamic firearms globally, featuring 200 guns, 80 of which are on permanent display. While many of the firearms originate from the Indian subcontinent, there are also numerous examples from Turkey, the Balkans, the Caucasus, Iran, North Africa, Arabia, and Afghanistan, all dating from the 17th to the 19th century.

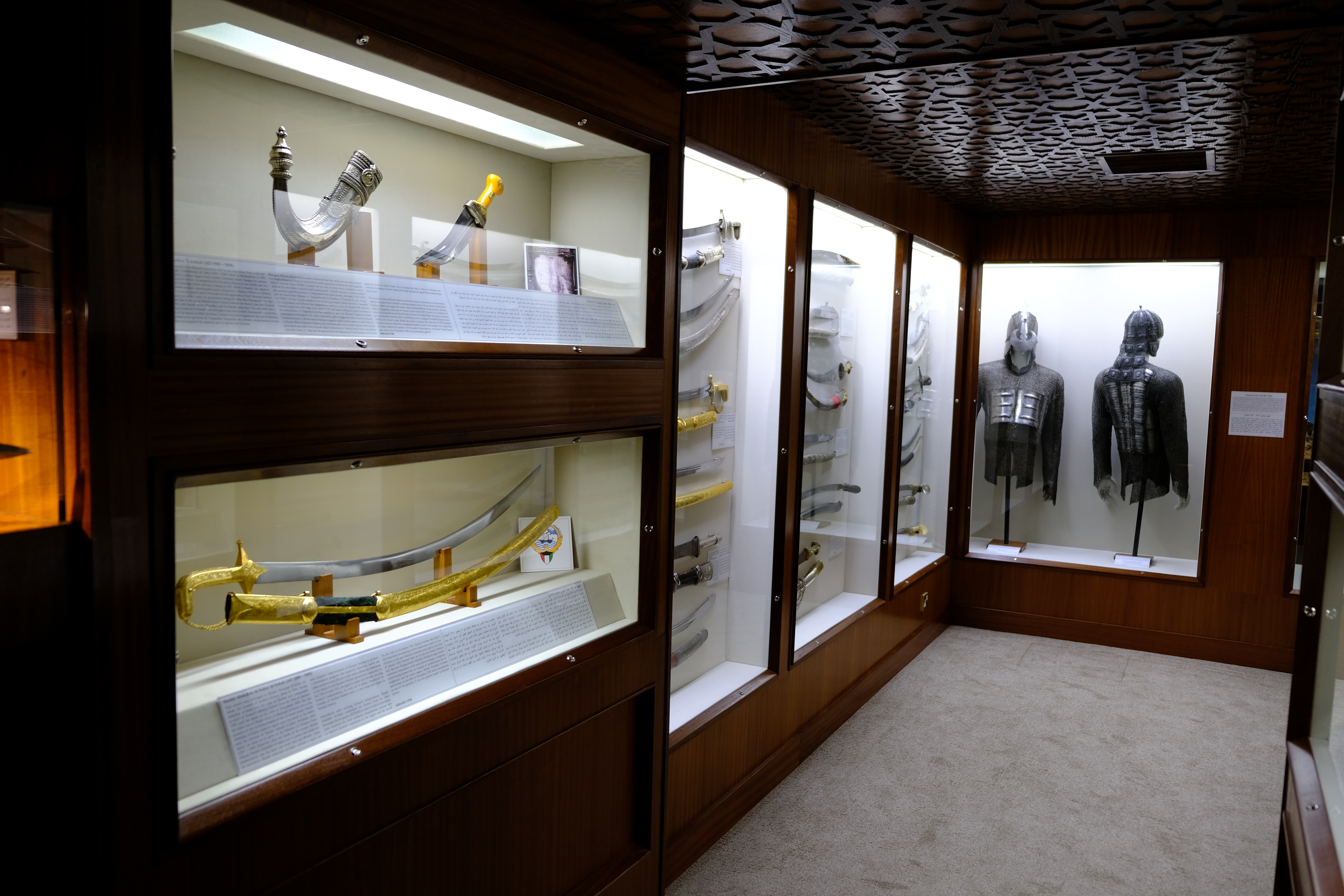
Entrance to The Sword Room

The sword and dagger collections are equally comprehensive. Currently, 41 swords are on display, with examples from North Africa to Southeast Asia and everywhere in between. The dagger collection includes 73 pieces on permanent display. Both collections highlight the similarities and differences in the styles and techniques used in the production of arms in the Islamic world, each reflecting the unique cultural characteristics of its origin. Notable examples on display include swords once belonging to Sheikh Abdullah Al-Salem Al-Sabah and Sir Bijay Chand Mahtab, and daggers owned by Francis Rawdon-Hastings and Sir Richard Turnbull.

Additionally, the museum showcases various examples of armour, including chainmail, helmets, and shields. Most of the armour collection originates from India and Iran. However, the earliest piece on display is a set of early 16th-century Ottoman mirror armour, stamped with the mark of the Irene arsenal.

=== Glass ===
The Tareq Rajab Museum's collection of glass objects spans from the early Islamic period to the late Mughal period in India. One of the earliest pieces is an 8th-century mould-blown inkwell from Mesopotamia or Iran, demonstrating early Islamic glassmaking techniques. The collection includes mould-blown glass objects such as a blue glass vase and a perfume vase from 11th-century Iran. Additionally, the museum houses beakers, cut glass flasks, jugs, ewers, and stem-cups from the 8th to the 14th century AD, showcasing the variety of glassware used in Islamic societies. A notable highlight is a pair of glass polychrome painted bottles from the 18th-century late Mughal period in India, known for their vibrant colours and detailed designs.

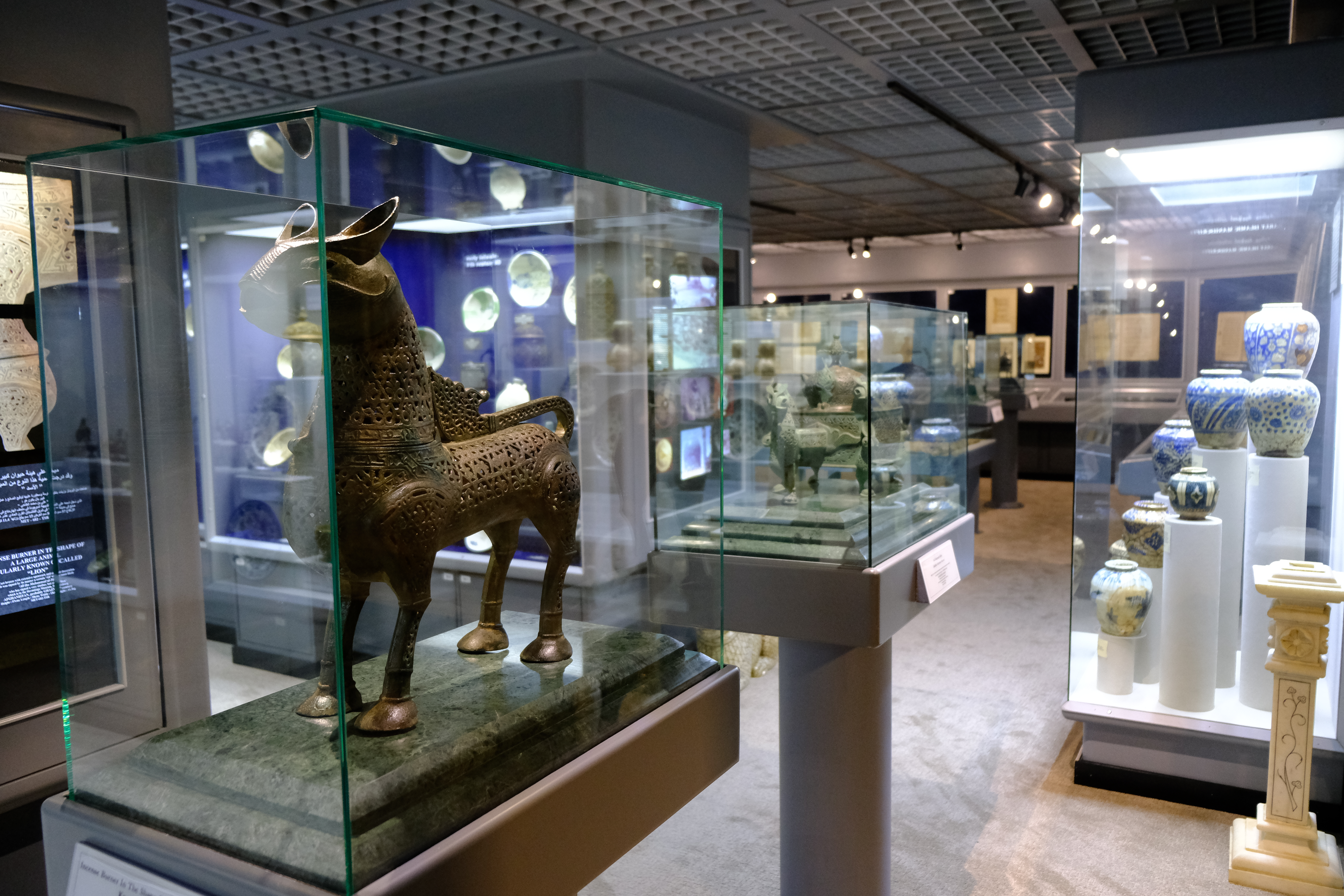
Metalwork on Display

=== Metalwork ===
The Tareq Rajab Museum's collection of Islamic metalwork, although more narrowly focused than its other collections, is particularly notable for its pieces from the Seljuq period of Iran and Central Asia (12th – 14th century AD). This collection also includes significant vessels from other regions of the Islamic world, including Egypt and Syria.

One of the earliest objects in the collection is a 7th-century AD bronze incense burner, believed to have originated in Syria during the Umayyad period. This piece shares many similarities with Byzantine vessels of the same type. A number of very large and rare cast bronze Islamic incense burners from 12th-century Afghanistan, are also on display. Additionally, the collection features a Fatimid bronze lion incense burner from the 11th – 12th century AD, which serves as the museum's mascot.

The museum also houses a variety of other metal objects, including ewers, pitchers, jugs, trays, bowls, cauldrons, oil lamps, inkwells and Sufi amulets. Each piece in this collection not only demonstrates the exquisite craftsmanship of its time but also reflects the diverse cultural influences and artistic traditions that have shaped Islamic metalwork throughout history. By highlighting the intricacies and beauty of these metalworks, the museum offers a comprehensive view of the rich heritage and artistic legacy of Islamic civilisation.

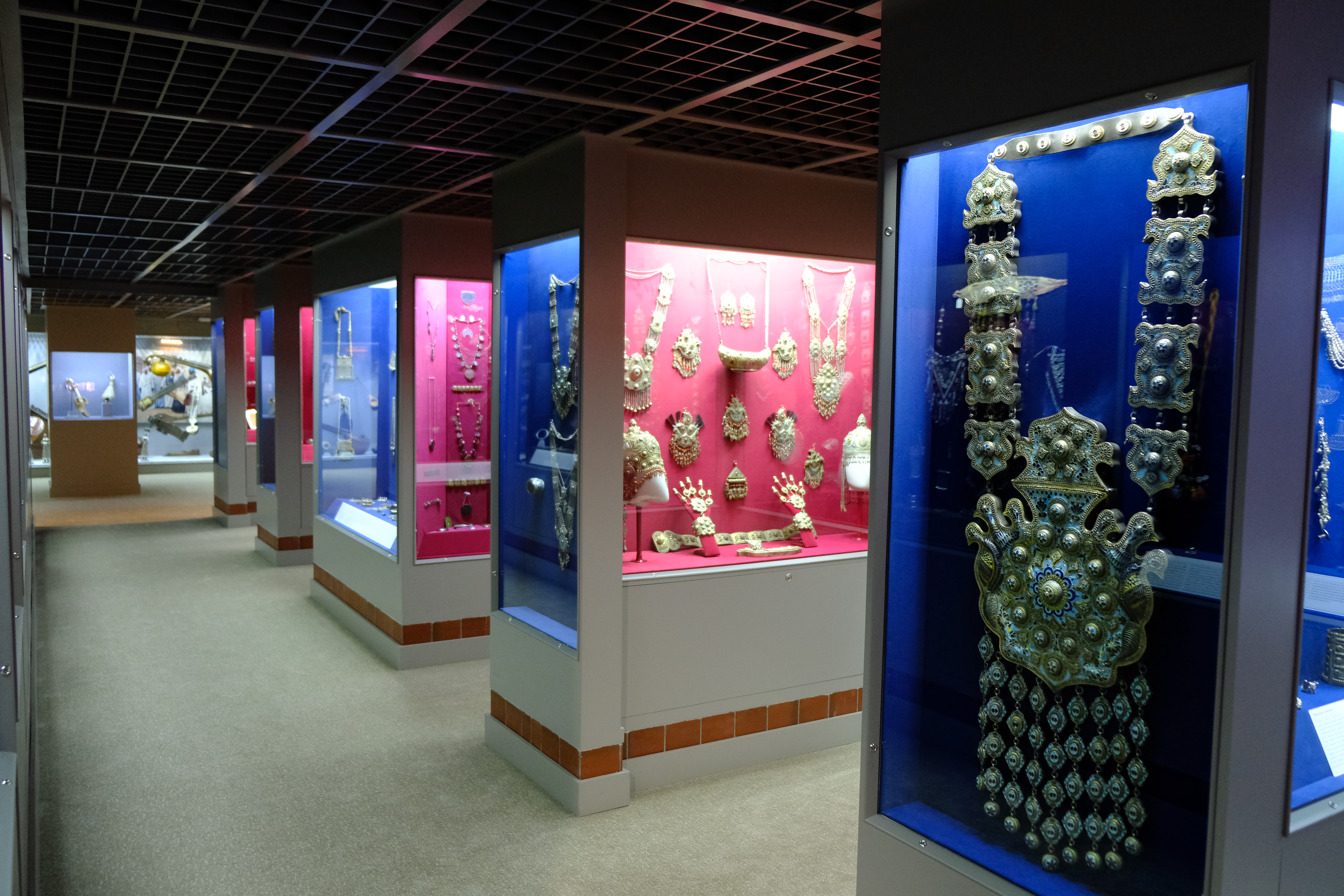
Silver Jewellery on Display

=== Silver jewellery ===
The Tareq Rajab Museum holds a vast and diverse collection of silver jewellery. This collection encompasses not only the jewellery of the Arab world but also that of the entire Islamic world. The museum serves as a significant resource for understanding the jewellery worn by people across different social strata, from the very poor to the wealthiest members of society. It offers more than just an exhibition of precious metals and gemstones; it provides insight into the cultural tastes and technical skills of various societies.

The jewellery collection includes thousands of individual pieces, reflecting a wide range of styles, materials, and techniques. Some notable examples include a Turkoman 'asyk' from Afghanistan or Iran, and a 'hunkun' or 'hirz' necklace from the Sultanate of Oman, adorned with gold decorations and Empress Maria Theresa thalers. Enamelled silver jewellery belonging to the last Amirs of Bukhara (circa 1885–1920) are also on display.

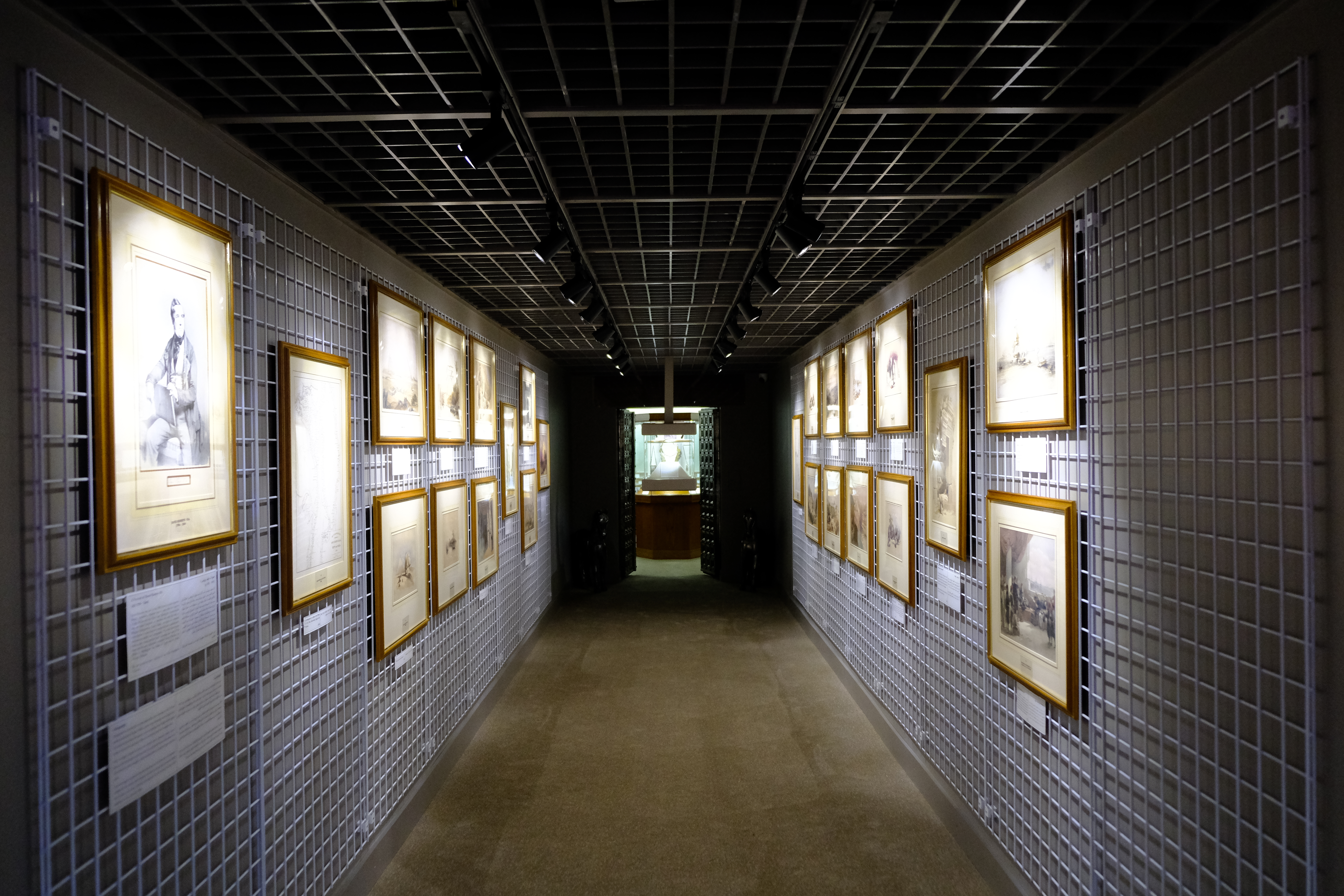
David Roberts Lithographs on Display

=== Orientalist artwork ===
The Tareq Rajab Museum houses a notable collection of artwork by prominent Orientalists such as David Roberts, Carl Haag, Frederick Goodall, Tomas Moragas, and other lesser-known artists of the period. Although much of the collection is currently in storage, several important pieces are on display. These include portraits of Lady Jane Digby el-Mesrab at Palmyra and her husband Sheikh Mijuel el-Mesrab (Palmyra).

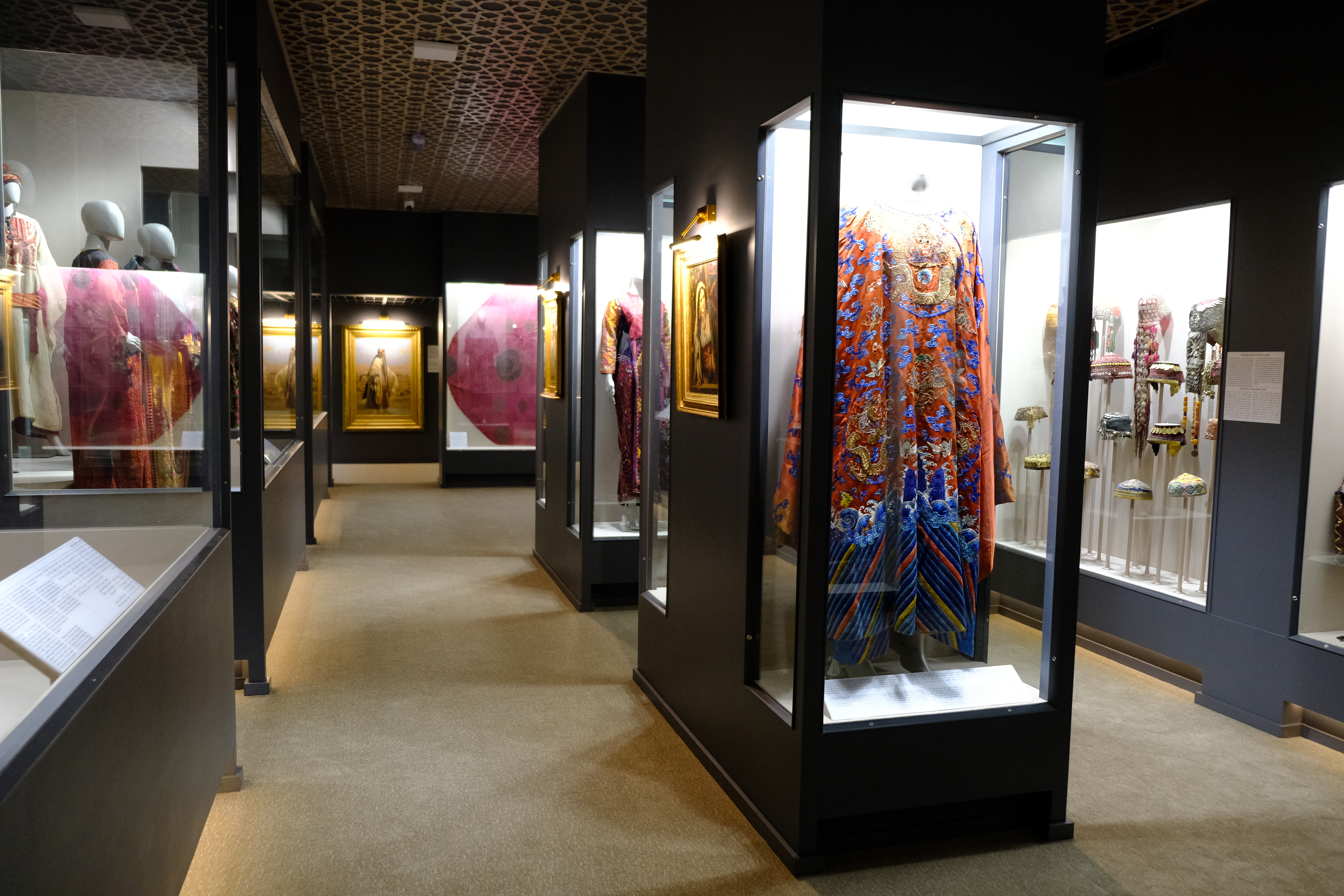
Textiles & Costumes Section

=== Textiles, embroideries and costumes ===
The Tareq Rajab Museum houses a large and important collection of textiles, embroideries, and costumes, featuring significant acquisitions from Syria, Palestine, Jordan, and various regions of Ottoman Turkey. This extensive collection also includes items from Afghanistan, North Africa, Indonesia, Iran, and India. The collection includes a variety of hats and headwear, many of which are adorned with embroidery, coins, beads, cowrie shells, and the popular 'pearl' buttons. While the museum houses a large number of costumes, only a select few are currently on display.

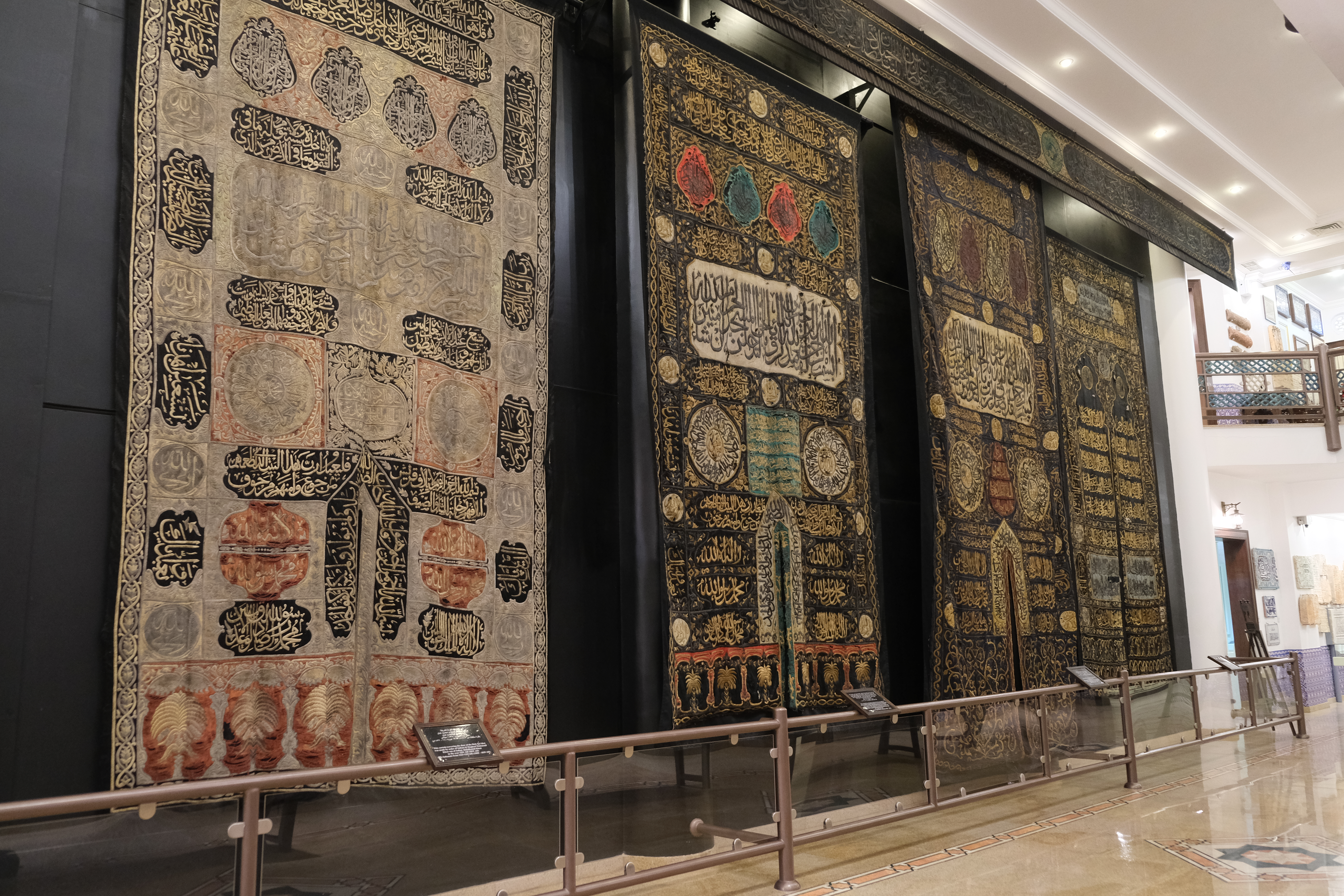
Four Sitara on display in the Calligraphy Museum

Additionally, the museum holds examples of 'Al-Sadu' or Bedouin weaving from Kuwait. These old Kuwaiti pieces are rare as they were typically used until they were worn out. Unfortunately, a significant number of carpets from Iraq and Iran were lost during the Iraqi invasion and occupation of Kuwait. An important aspect of the textile collection are the museums Holy Coverings. Among these are four curtains (Sitara) that were used to cover the entrance to the Ka'aba.

=== Musical instruments ===
The Tareq Rajab Museum houses a diverse collection of musical instruments from the Islamic world, spanning the 18th, 19th, and 20th centuries AD. This collection features a variety of the three main instruments of classical music: 'El Oud' (the lute), 'El Qanun' (the zither), and 'El Ney' (the flute). Additionally, the museum's collection includes drums, fiddles, and tambourines. A particularly notable piece within the collection is a North Indian ivory 'Sarinda,' dating to approximately AD 1800.

== Museum of Islamic calligraphy ==
The Tareq Rajab Museum of Islamic Calligraphy is a branch of the main Tareq Rajab Museum and is dedicated to the display of Islamic calligraphy in various forms of Arabic script. It was opened to the public in 2007 by the British Ambassador to Kuwait at the time, Stuart Laing. On display are the museum's collection of Holy Coverings, a large number of manuscripts, calligraphic art and a small number of decorated ceramics, metalwork and glass.

== See also ==
- List of Islamic art museums
