= Messila =

Area in Mubarak Al-Kabeer Governorate

Coordinates: 29°14′58.6″N 48°5′38.3″E

Messila (Arabic: المسيلة) is an area in the Mubarak Al-Kabeer Governorate in Kuwait. The Messila Water Village, founded 1992, and the Jumeirah Messilah Beach Hotel are located in the area.
