= New English School (Kuwait) =

- Street 1, Block 12, Jabriya; Kuwait

Information
- Type: Independent
- Motto: Ex Oriente Lux (lit. 'The light from the East')
- Established: 1969
- Founder: Tareq S.Rajab
- Director: Dr. Ziad T.S. Rajab
- Principal: Richard Marchant
- Faculty: c. 200
- Grades: KG, 1–13
- Enrollment: >2000
- Mascot: Dhow
- Website: neskt.com

The New English School, founded in 1969 by Tareq Rajab, is a co-educational British curriculum, English medium, private school in Jabriya, Kuwait, which caters for children between the ages of 3½ and 19. The New English School has recently been known for ranking #1 in MENA Region (Middle East and North Africa) for achieving a staggering 44 Outstanding Cambridge Learner Awards, making it the highest in the entire region.

== Standards ==
Students at the New English School follow the assessment, grading, and examinations of schools in the United Kingdom. This includes the International GCSE and GCE Advanced Levels. The New English School is a member of the European Council of International Schools (ECIS) and is accredited by British Schools in the Middle East (BSME).

In 2011, the school achieved British School Overseas status, approved by the UK Department for Education and monitored by Ofsted.

== Extra-curriculars and Socieites ==
NES offers over 50+ extracurriculars, the most popular ones being:

1. Model United Nations (MUN) - NES also participates / hosts MUN conferences, simulating an accurate experience of the United Nations.
2. Environmental Club
3. Five-a-side football club

NES also consists of societies (An organisation or membership in which students become a part of and participate in after-school sessions / competitions). These consist of:

1. NESMED (NES Medicine)
2. NESENG (NES Engineering)
3. NESRobotics (NES Robotics)
4. NESLAW (NES Law)
5. etc.

== Facilities ==
The school is housed in purpose-built, centrally air-conditioned buildings for Primary and Secondary departments. The Secondary Department contains 35 classrooms, 11 science laboratories, specialist geography rooms, four computer centres, drama rooms, a music suite, two gymnasiums, audio-visual resources, a sixth form centre, and a library with 20,000 volumes. The Primary Department has 38 classrooms, a library, a music room for each section, and a computer centre. The school also contains an all-purpose hall and an armchair theatre.

== Relationship with other schools ==
NES maintains ties with the United Kingdom and other British and international schools abroad. It is a member of ECIS and BSME.

== Rivalries ==
NES has a long-standing sporting and other fields of competitive rivalry with other British international schools in Kuwait, most notably The British School of Kuwait (BSK) and Kuwait English School. NES have recently just won, as of November 2026, their Open Age ISACK Football Tournament with a staggering 5-4 win against BSK in the finals.

=== BSME Games ===
As a member of the British Schools in the Middle East (BSME), NES competes regionally in events such as U13, U16 and U19 volleyball, athletics, swimming, and football. These competitions often feature BSK and KNES, adding intensity to the school rivalries.

=== Local leagues and ISACK ===
On a local level, NES competes in **ISACK (International Schools Athletic Conference of Kuwait)** matches against other British schools, including BSK and KNES. These weekly and seasonal fixtures across multiple sports further strengthen school rivalries.

=== Inter-house competitions ===
NES also fosters internal competition through inter-house events such as Sports Day, athletics tournaments, and basketball inter-house competitions, which encourage teamwork and school spirit. While internal, these events often mirror the intensity of external rivalries.

== Demographics ==
A significant proportion of the student body comes from expatriate communities living in Kuwait. NES is known for having a diverse population representing many nationalities.

Based on demographic reporting in Kuwait, the largest nationality groups represented at the school include:

1. Egyptian
2. Indian
3. Kuwaiti
4. Pakistani
5. British

These reflect broader expatriate trends in Kuwait, where Egyptians, Indians and Pakistanis form the largest foreign communities.

== Notable alumni ==
- Rania Al-Yasin, Queen of Jordan since 1999.
- Ghassan Abu-Sittah
- Nada al-Nashif
