= Rumaithiya =

Rumaithiya الرميثية
- Area
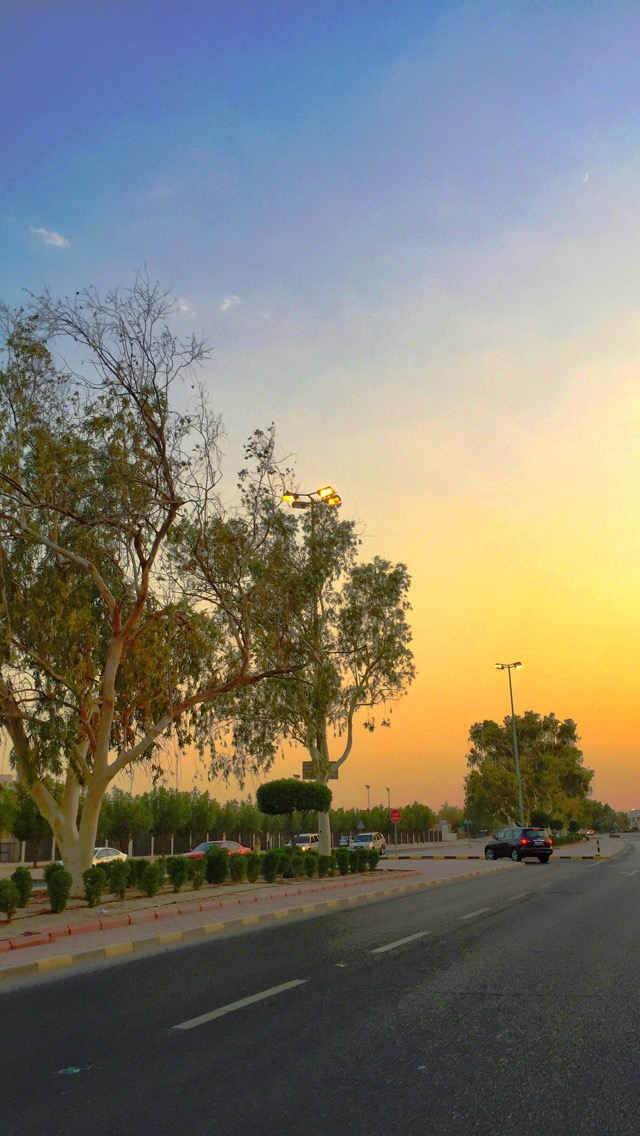
- Naṣir Al-Mbarak Street, the main street in Rumaithiya
- Etymology: Haloxylon plant (rimth in Arabic)
- Nickname: al-Rumaythiyya al-Muqaddisa (الرميثية المقدسة, transl. Holy Rumaithiya)
- Interactive map outlining Rumaithiya
- Coordinates: 29°19′N 48°4′E; Rumaithiya on Kuwait's Official GIS Maps
- Country: Kuwait
- Governorate: Hawalli
- Established: 1964 (incorporated)
- Blocks: 12

Area
  - Total: 4.8 km^{2} (1.9 sq mi)

Population (June 2023)
  - Total: 58,127
  - Density: 12,000/km^{2} (31,000/sq mi)
- Time zone: GMT+3
- Electoral Circle: 1st
- Representatives in the National Assembly: Vacant as of May 2024
- Co-Op Society: Rumaithiya Co-Op Society
- Location: Block 7 & Block 9
- Chair: ʿAbbās ʿAli l-Fīli

Rumaithiya (Arabic: الرميثية, Gulf Arabic: l-irmēθīya) is a mainly-residential area in Hawalli governorate and a suburb of Kuwait City. It is divided into twelve blocks. The population of Rumaithiya was 58,127, according to the June 2023 estimate by the Public Authority for Civil Information. A significant proportion of Rumaithiya's residents are Shia Muslims.

== History ==
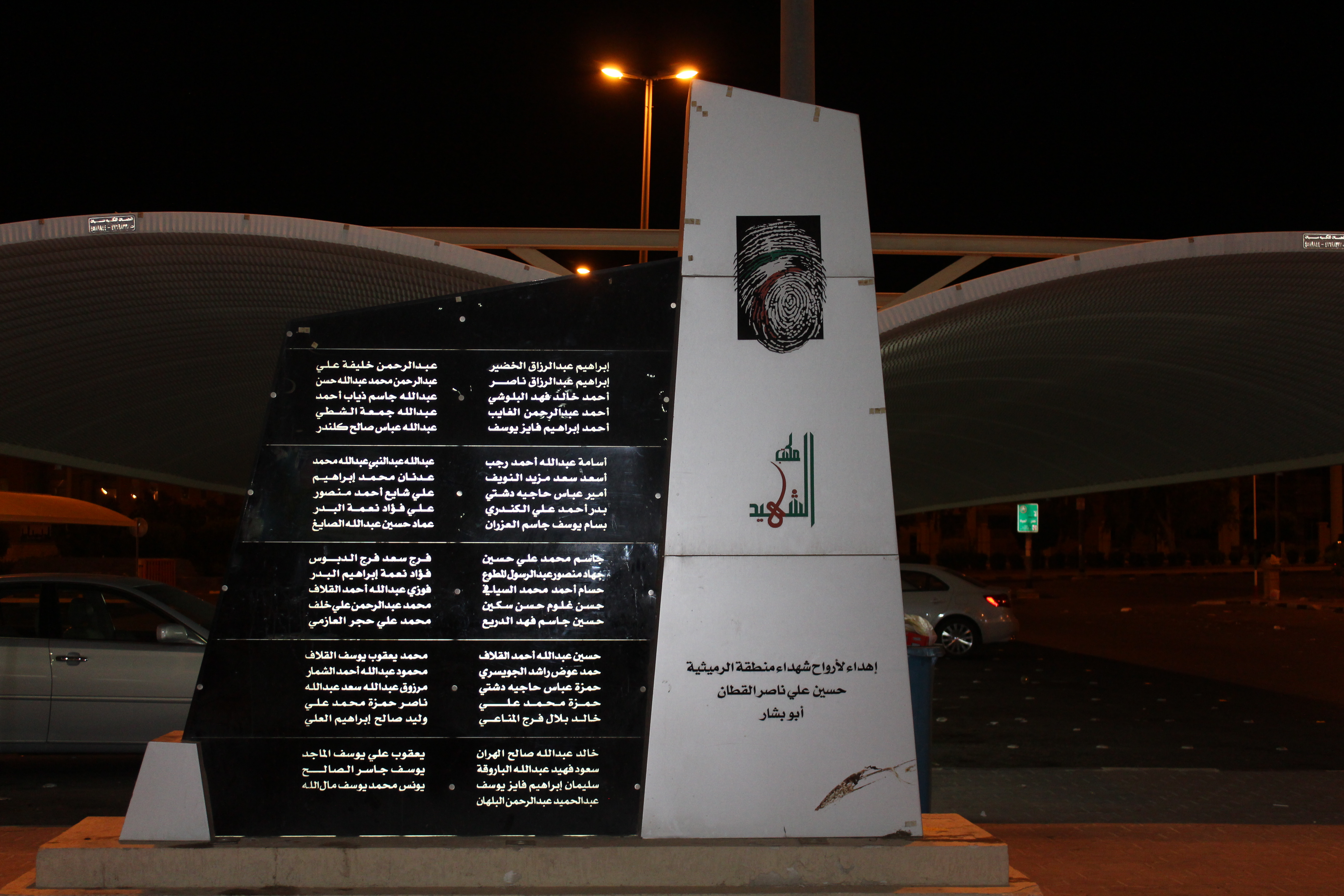
A Monument dedicated to the martyrs of the Iraqi invasion of Kuwait in 1990–1991 at Rumaithiya Co-Op in Block 7.

The general area of Rumaithiya was already known by the time Syrian traveller Faisal Al-Adhama visited Kuwait in 1942 and wrote about it in his 1945 book In The Pearl Country (Arabic: في بلاد اللؤلؤ), where he describes it as a "beautiful place neighboring Dimna." (nowadays Salmiya). When the area of modern Rumaihiya was officially drawn in 1964, it had 13 blocks. However, the 13th block was completely separated from the rest of the area by Kuwait's 5th Ring Road, a major highway, and its location was more fit as part of contiguous Salmiya.

Rumaithiya was a prominent area during the Iraqi invasion of Kuwait in 1990–1991. The area participated in repeated protests, raised the Kuwaiti flag and refused to acknowledge Iraqi claims and puppet government. Many of the area's residents participated in the Kuwaiti Resistance and many were executed. A monument dedicated to the memory of the fallen was gifted by a Rumaithiya residents and erected in the main Co-Op square. The bullet impacts from the time can still be seen on some homes. The youngest captive, Zahrāʾ l-iQdēḥi, who was the grandchild of Aḥmad is-Sayyāfi, was captured with her grandfather and his resistance group in Block 11. Is-Sayyāfi's residence housed telecommunication equipment used for communicating with the allied forces, but this was neutralized in January before the coalition's airstrikes.

== Places and services ==
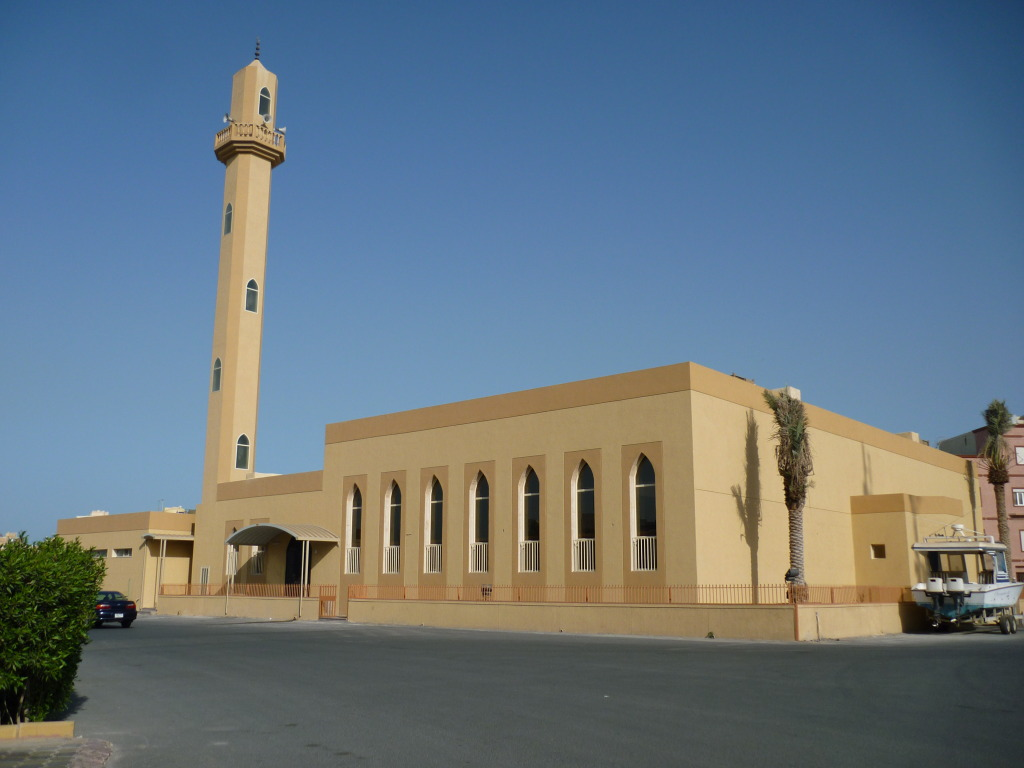
ʿUqba ibn Nāfiʿ mosque in Block 8

Each block of the area is served by the publicly-run Rumaithiya Co-Op Society for groceries and other basic food and retail services with the main market and mall in blocks 7 and 9. More than 15,000 people are registered shareholders of the Co-Op.

Two public parks are located in the area, a large one in Block 6 with grass pitches, and a smaller one in Block 8 with grass pitches. In addition, Rumaithiya is home to an exceptionally high number of schools (13 schools, not including private schools and kindergartens). However, due to the buildings' age, many of them are out of service.

With the exception of Maqāmis Mosque, Each block is served by a publicly-funded mosque. Rumaithiya is also home to Masjid Maqamis, which serves the Shi'ite community, as well as numerous other husainiyas which become especially active during the Islamic month of Muharram.

== Politics ==
Rumaithiya is located within Kuwait's 1st Electoral Circle. Rumaithiya usually elects several Shi'ites to the parliament. Some former and current members of parliament from Rumaithiya include Ṣaḷāḥ Khōrshīd and Hāni Shams.
