= Hawalli Governorate =

Governorate of Kuwait

Hawalli Governorate محافظة حولي
- Governorate
- Map of Kuwait with Hawalli highlighted
- Coordinates (Hawalli District): 29°18′20″N 48°01′51″E
- Country: Kuwait
- Established: 1962
- Seat: Hawalli
- Areas: 17

Area
  - Total: 85 km^{2} (33 sq mi)

Population (2021)
  - Total: 926,170
  - Density: 11,000/km^{2} (28,000/sq mi)
- Time zone: UTC+03 (EAT)
- ISO 3166 code: KW-HW

Hawalli Governorate (Arabic: محافظة حولي Muḥāfaẓat Ḥawalli) is one of the six governorates of Kuwait. Established in 1962, the governorate covers an area of approximately 85 km^{2} (33 sq mi) and is subdivided into 17 areas. According to the 2021 census, it had a population of 926,170.

== Geography ==
Hawalli Governorate is one of the six governorates of Kuwait. Along with Capital and Ahmadi, it was one of the three governorates established in 1962 when Kuwait was divided into governorates. The governorate is situated in the Persian Gulf and is bordered by the governorates of Asemah (Capital) to the west, Farwaniya to the southwest, and Mubarak Al-Kabeer to the south. It occupies a land area of 85 km^{2} (33 sq mi), and is sub-divided into 17 areas: Bayan, Jabriya, Rumaithiya, Salam, Salwa, Al-Bida'a, Anjafa, Hawally, Hitteen, Mishrif, Mubarak Al-Abdullah, Salmiya, Shaab, Shuhada, Al-Siddiq, Ministries Area, and Zahra.

== Demographics and housing ==
According to the 2021 census, Hawalli Governorate had a population of 926,170, comprising 522,638 males and 403,532 females. It is the second most populated governorate in Kuwait after Farwaniya. Majority of the population live in high-rise residential buildings located within or near major commercial and business districts in densely populated urban districts. About 741,882 were aged 15 and above, of which 428,537 were married, 275,702 had never married, 26,317 were divorced and 9,183 were widowed.

The govenorate has a substantial expatriate population. Kuwaiti citizens numbered 243,919, representing approximately 26.3% of the population, while non-Kuwaiti residents numbered 682,251, accounting for approximately 73.7%. The Kuwaiti population consisted of 119,799 males and 124,120 females, while the non-Kuwaiti population included 402,839 males and 279,412 females. Of the non-Kuwaiti citizens, 252,260 were from the Gulf Cooperation Council countries, 352,631 were from other Arab countries, and 295,993 from other Asian countries. The remaining included 7,360 from sub-Saharan Africa, 7,988 from Europe, 8,528 from North America, 741 from South America, and 669 from Oceania.

== Economy ==
Hawalli Governorate had 29,934 registered establishments, of which 29,601 were in the private sector. Of the population aged 15 years and above, 539,076 were employed. Retain and trade was the largest employment category, accounting for 107,296 people, followed by construction with 55,000, and public administration and defence with 47,608. Salmiya is a major commercial centre in the governorate with several shopping malls and traditional markets.
