= Timeline of Kuwait City =

Coordinates: 29.369722°N 47.978333°E

The following is a timeline of the history of Kuwait City, Al Asimah Governorate, Kuwait, and its metro surroundings.

== 18th century ==
- Early 1700s — Small fishing village of Grane or Kureyn under the control of the Bani Khalid Emirate, independent of Ottoman control since 1670
- 1750s — Bani Utbah migrants establish the Sheikhdom of Kuwait under the auspices of the Bani Khalid
- 1775–1779 — Siege of Basra by Persia prompts Iraqi merchants and shipwrights to relocate to Kuwait City, along with trade routes from India, Muscat, and Persia to Baghdad, Aleppo, Smyrna, and Constantinople
- 1792 — E. India Company establishes Kuwaiti factory, tying the city's trade to East Africa

== 19th century ==
- 1871 — Al-Hasa Expedition returns Kuwait to Ottoman rule
- 1875 — Kuwait organized as part of Basra Vilayet
- 1899 — Treaty with the United Kingdom signed by Mubarak Al-Sabah

== 20th century ==
- 1901 — Population: c. 15,000
- 1904 — Seif Palace expansion begins
- 1912 — U.S. mission established
- 1915 — Salim Al-Mubarak Al-Sabah becomes governor of Kuwait City
- 1921 — City wall built; Ahmad Al-Jaber Al-Sabah becomes sultan
- 1930 — Kuwait Municipality established
- 1936 — Central Library established
- 1948 — Population: c. 80,000
- 1950s — Hawally development begins near city
- 1951 — Urban master plan commissioned
- 1957 — City wall removed; Kuwait National Museum founded.
- 1961 — Kuwait Fund for Arab Economic Development headquartered in city
- 1962 — City becomes part of newly established Capital Governorate; Nasir Sabah Nasir Mubarak I becomes governor; Al-Watan newspaper begins publication
- 1963 — National Assembly of Kuwait headquartered in city.
- 1965 — Kuwait Transport Company established; public transit begins with route from city center to Fahaheel District; Population: 99,633
- 1966 — Kuwait University established
- 1967 — Arab Towns Organization headquartered in Kaifan
- 1970 — Urban master plan commissioned (approximate date)
- 1972 — Al-Qabas newspaper begins publication
- 1974 — Japanese embassy attacked (7 Feb.)
- 1975 — International School of Pakistan established in Al Farwaniyah; Population: 78,116
- 1976 — Al-Anba newspaper begins publication; Kuwait Water Towers built
- 1979 — Kuwait Towers built; Salim Sabah Nasir Mubarak I becomes governor (approximate date); Jahra Governorate established near city
- 1980 — Kuwait Petroleum Corporation headquartered in city
- 1982 — Kuwait National Assembly Building and Al-Fahed Mosque built
- 1983 — 1983 Kuwait bombings (12 Dec.); Dar Al Athar Al Islamiyyah (cultural entity) established
- 1984 — Gulf Cooperation Council meets
- 1985 — Jabir Abdallah Jabir Abdallah II becomes governor
- 1986 — Grand Mosque (Kuwait) and Al-Marzook Medical Center and Mosque built
- 1988 — Lycée Français de Koweït established in Salmiya; Farwaniya Governorate established near city
- 1990 — Invasion of Kuwait by Iraqi forces (2–4 Aug.)
- 1991 — Iraqis ousted (Feb.)
- 1993 — Liberation Tower (Kuwait) and Al-Mubarrah Community Center built; Urban master plan created by Kuwait Municipality
- 1994 — National Library of Kuwait headquartered in city
- 1995 — Population: 28,747 in Kuwait City
- 1998 — Al-Sharq Waterfront built
- 1999 — Mubarak Al-Kabeer Governorate established near city

== 21st century ==
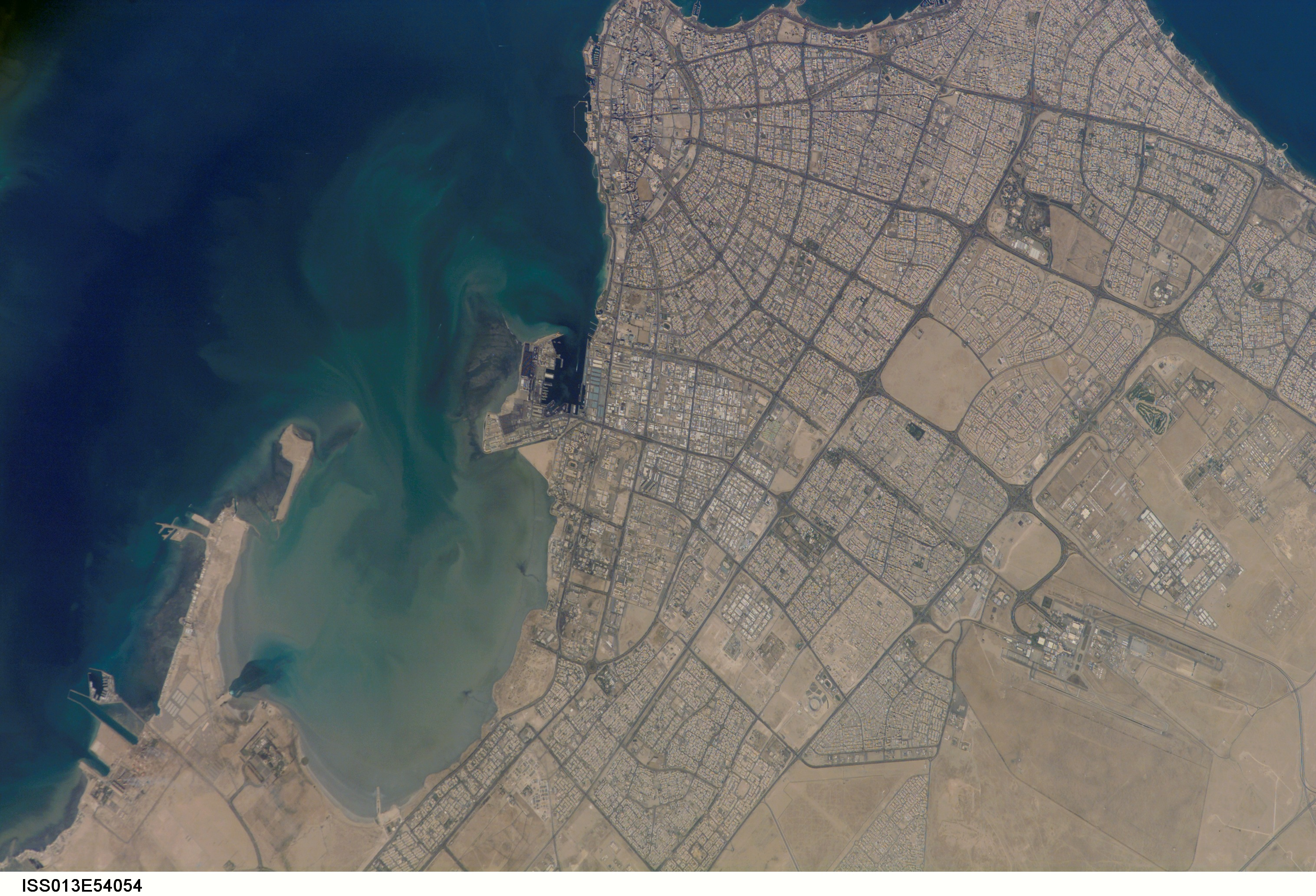
Kuwait City, from the International Space Station in 2006

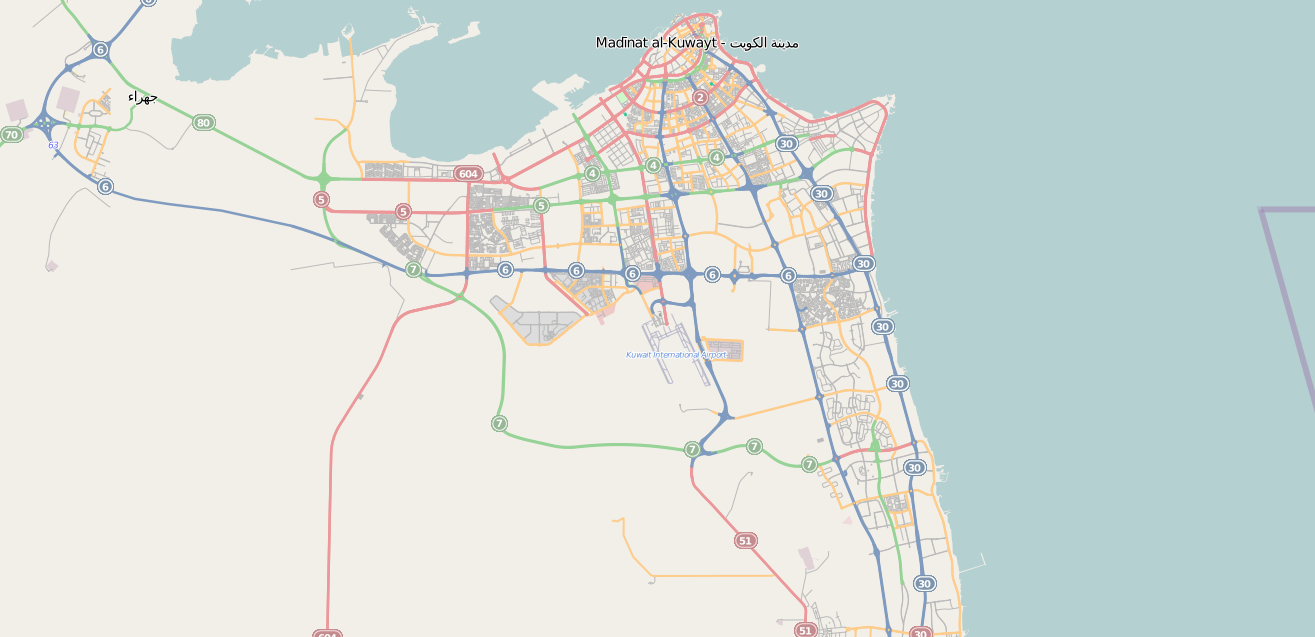
Map of Kuwait City, 2011

- 2001 — Population: 388,532 in Capital Governorate
- 2002 — 2002 West Asian Games held (Apr.)
- 2003 — Museum of Modern Art opens; Urban master plan created
- 2004 — Kuwait Petroleum Corporation Tower built; American University of Kuwait opens in Salmiya
- 2005 — Dar Al Awadi Tower built in Sharq
- 2006 — General election held 29 June, the first including female voters
- 2008 — Kuwait International Airport's new terminal built
- 2009 — Arraya Tower built
- 2011 — Al Hamra Tower built
- 2014 — Population: 538,053 in Capital Governorate, 1,094,576 in Farwaniya Governorate, 898,401 in Hawalli Governorate, and 232,428 in Mubarak Al-Kabeer Governorate
- 2026 — Kuwait struck by Iran in 2026 Iran War (Feb 28-present)

== See also ==
- Kuwait City history
- Other names of Kuwait City
- List of areas of Capital Governorate

== Bibliography ==
Published in 19th century

- James Horsburgh (1852). "Persian Gulf, West Side: Graen, or Grane, called also Quade". India Directory: Or, Directions for Sailing to and from the East Indies, China, Australia, and the Interjacent Ports of Africa and South America (6th ed.). London: William H. Allen & Co. – via Google Books.
- Edward Balfour (1885), "Koweit, also called Quade or Grave", Cyclopaedia of India (3rd ed.), London: B. Quaritch, hdl:2027/mdp.39015068611014 – via HathiTrust, "Al Quaat"

Published in 20th century

- Wahab, Robert Alexander (1910). "Kuwēt" . Encyclopædia Britannica. Vol. 15 (11th ed.). p. 956.
- British Admiralty (1916). "Sultanate of Koweit: Towns: Koweit". Handbook of Arabia. Vol. 1. London: British War Office. hdl:2027/njp.32101006882755.
- "Kuwait". Persian Gulf Pilot. Washington DC: Government Printing Office. 1920.
- L.W. Amps (1953). "Kuwait Town Development". Journal of the Royal Central Asian Society. 40 (3–4). UK: 234–240. doi:10.1080/03068375308731484.
- Abdul-llah Abu-Ayyash (1980). "Urban Development and Planning Strategies in Kuwait". International Journal of Urban and Regional Research. 4.
- Najat Abd al-Qadir al-Jasim (1980). The Kuwait Municipality over 50 Years. Kuwait Municipality.
- Stephen Gardiner; Ian Cook (1983). Kuwait, the making of a city. Longman. ISBN 978-0-582-78356-0.
- Norconsult (1984), Public Transport in Kuwait Town and Urban Areas, Kuwait Municipality and Kuwait Transport Company
- Saleh Abdulghani Al-Mutawa (1994), History of Architecture in Old Kuwait City

Published in 21st century

- Yasser Elsheshtawy, ed. (2008). "Kuwait: learning from a globalized city". The Evolving Arab City: Tradition, Modernity and Urban Development. Routledge. ISBN 978-1-134-12821-1.
- Angie Turner (2008), "Kuwait City", in Michael R.T. Dumper; Bruce E. Stanley (eds.), Cities of the Middle East and North Africa, USA: ABC-CLIO, p. 229+, ISBN 9781576079195
- Farah al-Nakib (2013). "Kuwait's Modern Spectacle: Oil Wealth and the Making of a New Capital City, 1950–90". Comparative Studies of South Asia, Africa and the Middle East. 33: 7–25. doi:10.1215/1089201X-2072694. S2CID 154520615.
- Gwyn Lloyd Jones (2014). "Kuwait City, Kuwait". In Murray Fraser; Nasser Golzari (eds.). Architecture and Globalisation in the Persian Gulf Region. Ashgate. pp. 37–56. ISBN 978-1-4094-7098-4.
