= List of tallest buildings in Kuwait =

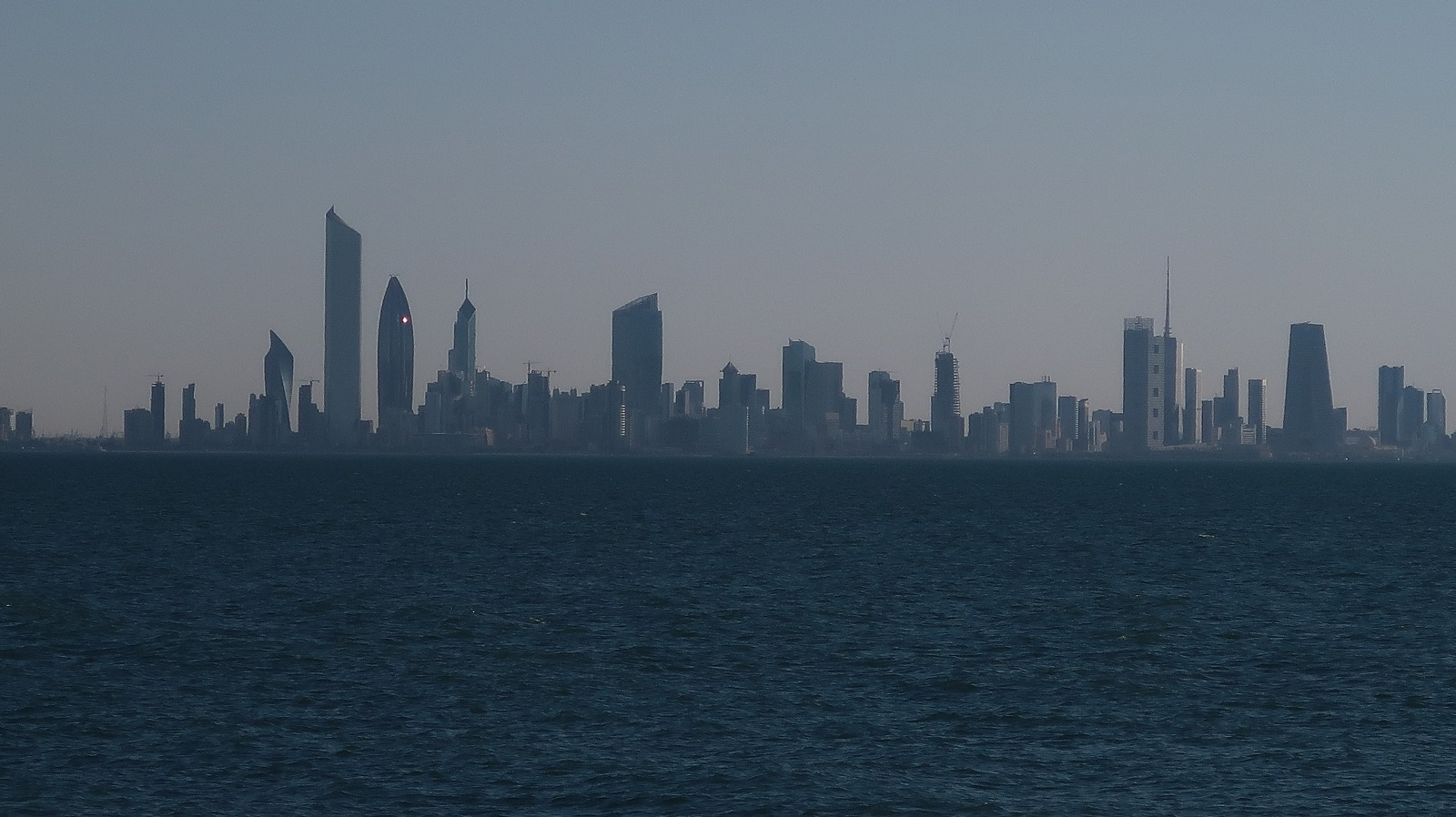
Kuwait City skyline seen from the Jaber Al-Ahmad Al Sabah Causeway in 2025

This list of tallest buildings in Kuwait ranks skyscrapers in Kuwait by height. The tallest building in Kuwait is currently the 80–story Al Hamra Tower, which rises 413 metres (1,355 ft) and was completed in 2011, it is also the world's fifteenth-tallest building. The Assima Tower is currently the second-tallest completed building in Kuwait, at 302 metres (991 ft). Should it be constructed, the Burj Mubarak Al Kabir would be 1,001 metres (3,284 ft) tall, becoming the world's tallest building, only next to another yet unfinished project - the Jeddah Tower in Jeddah, Saudi Arabia at 1,008 metres, which has recently restarted construction as of 2025.

== Tallest completed buildings ==
Was the tallest building in Kuwait upon completion

Only buildings over 150 metres (as determined by the Council on Tall Buildings and Urban Habitat) are included.

Rank	Name	Height (metres)	Floors	City	Use	Built
1	Al Hamra Tower	413 m (1,355 ft)	84	Kuwait City	Office	2011
2	Assima Tower	302 m (991 ft)	65	Kuwait City	Office	2023
3	NBK Tower (NBK Headquarters)	300 m (980 ft)	61	Kuwait City	Office	2019
4	Arraya Tower	300 m (980 ft)	60	Kuwait City	Office	2009
5	KIPCO Tower (KIPCO Headquarters)	240 m (790 ft)	60	Kuwait City	Mixed Use	2011
6	Crystal Tower	240 m (790 ft)	52	Kuwait City	Office	2013
7	Central Bank of Kuwait	240 m (790 ft)	42	Kuwait City	Office	2013
8	Kuwait Investment Authority Headquarters	220 m (720 ft)	50	Kuwait City	Office	2018
9	Al Tijaria Tower	218 m (715 ft)	41	Kuwait City	Office	2009
10	Burj Alshaya West Tower	205 m (673 ft)	45	Kuwait City	Office	2018
11	Abdul Aziz Al Babtain Cultural Waqf	189 m (620 ft)	42	Kuwait City	Office	2010
12	Business Town Tower 5	184 m (604 ft)	39	Kuwait City	Office	2011
13	Dar Al Awadi	171 m (561 ft)	35	Kuwait City	Office	2005
14	25 February Tower	170 m (560 ft)	37	Kuwait City	Office	2006
15	Panasonic Tower	167 m (548 ft)	34	Kuwait City	Office	2009
16	Al Jon Tower	160 m (520 ft)	40	Kuwait City	Office	2007
17	Al Jawhara Tower	160 m (520 ft)	27	Kuwait City	Office	2008
18	Arabiya Tower	150 m (490 ft)	34	Kuwait City	Office	2009

== Tallest buildings under construction ==
Rank	Name	Height (meters)	Floors	City	Use	Completion
1	The Square Capital Tower	376 m (1,234 ft)	70	Kuwait City	Mixed Use	2029
2	Mandarin Oriental Kuwait	345 m (1,132 ft)	80	Kuwait City	Hotel	2028
3	Gate of Kuwait Tower	330 m (1,080 ft)	85	Kuwait City	Mixed Use	2015
4	Capital Market Authority Headquarters (Kuwait)	240 m (790 ft)	46	Kuwait City	Office	2027
5	Boubyan Bank Tower	230 m (750 ft)	83	Kuwait City	Office	2026

== Tallest approved buildings ==
Rank	Name	Height (meters)	Floors	City	Use	Completion
1	Intercontinental Hotel and Tower	225 m (738 ft)	66	Kuwait City	Mixed Use	On Hold
2	Business Town Tower 6	168 m (551 ft)	35	Kuwait City	Office	On Hold

== Tallest proposed buildings ==
Rank	Name	Height (meters)	Floors	City	Use
1	Millennium Challenge Tower	1,852 m (6,076 ft)	300	Kuwait City	Mixed Use
2	Burj Mubarak Al Kabir	1,001 m (3,284 ft)	234	Silk City	Mixed Use
3	KDIPA Headquarters Building	275 m (902 ft)	56	Kuwait City	Office
4	Kuwait Commercial Tower	220 m (720 ft)	38	Kuwait City	Office
5	Al Sharq Office Building	180 m (590 ft)		Kuwait City	Office
6	Montana Hotel	166 m (545 ft)	36	Kuwait City	Hotel

== Tallest structures ==
Rank	Name	Height (meters)	City	Use	Completion
1	Liberation Tower	372 m (1,220 ft)	Kuwait City	Communication	1996
2	Kuwait Towers	187 m (614 ft)	Kuwait City	Mixed Use	1979

== See also ==
- List of tallest structures in the Middle East
- List of tallest buildings in Asia
- List of tallest buildings and structures in the world
- Proposed tall buildings and structures
