= Three walls of Kuwait =

Former city walls of Kuwait

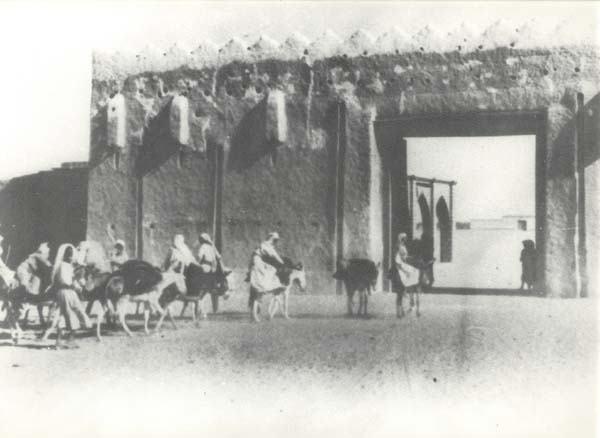
One of the wall's gates in 1937

Since the founding of the village that would develop into Kuwait City, its boundaries were at times defined by three successively larger walls. The first, built in the late 1700s, was constructed as the village sought to defend itself while the influence of the Bani Khalid tribe waned. A second wall was built in the early 1800s, and a third after a war resulted in fighting close to the town in 1920. Each of these semicircular walls protected a larger internal area and longer stretch of coastline. The final wall was destroyed in the 1950s as the city was rebuilt along a new urban masterplan. Its five gates were preserved.

The walls provided administrative as well as defensive benefits, with its gates serving as points where the town could manage taxes and customs. Although population growth sometimes led to expansion beyond the walls and the subsequent construction of larger walls, the presence of the walls shaped the development of the city. The memory of the walls retains some cultural importance, although they are not widely remembered. The construction of the third wall became a temporal boundary that defines part of Kuwaiti nationality law. The former path of the third wall still represents a municipal boundary and is visible through the presence of gardens and a ring road.

== Background ==
The village that would develop into Kuwait City was founded around 1716 by Bani Utbah migrants, on a coastal site with limited administration from the Bani Khalid. Its natural harbour and geographic position facilitated the town's development through maritime trade. However, to the landward side, the town was exposed to bedouin raiders. The influence of the Bani Khalid faded over time. Local tradition holds that the Bani Utbah selected a leader from amongst themselves in 1752.

== First wall ==
Under the rule of Abdullah I Al-Sabah, the first wall was constructed around 1760. The creation of this wall was a symbolic marker of the town's self-government. It ran for 750 metres (2,460 ft), protecting 600 metres (2,000 ft) of coastline. The area it enclosed was small, reaching only 300 metres (980 ft) inland at its furthest point from the coast. Five gates were built: Al-Fadagh, Al-Mudairis, Qibla, Bin Batti, and Al-Qarawiya.

This area is now the location of the Seif Palace. Of its original buildings, only four mosques remain. The wall's gates (called darwazas, meaning they were large enough for a laden camel) provided places where taxes could easily be collected. There were some threats to Kuwait during this period, including an attack by the Banu Ka'b tribe which is sometimes associated with the wall's construction.

== Second wall ==
The town's population soon outgrew the space within the first wall. The town also faced continued threats, including the 1793 invasion by the First Saudi state. Built over two months in 1811, a second wall extended 2,300 metres (7,500 ft). Abdullah I Al-Sabah, still ruler during this time, was concerned about attacks from the Al-Muntafiq.

The seven gates of the second wall, from west to east, were named Al-Badr (named after its neighbourhood), Al-Fedagh (named after a guard, sometimes with a longer name including "Saud" that reflects the neighbourhood), Al-Sabaan (named after its neighbourhood), Al-Sanger (named after its neighbourhood; a longer name adds the name of a Sheik), Al-Abdulrazzaq (named after a nearby mosque), Al-Qarwia (named after the Qarwia community known for using that gate), and Bin Butti (named after a nearby mosque). An eighth gate was added between Al-Fedagh and Al-Sabaan at a later point.

Like the first wall, the second one was semicircular. The roughly 0.724 square kilometres (0.280 sq mi) of land within the wall was, however, substantially larger than the area within the first wall. The wall reached 700 metres (2,300 ft) inland and protected roughly 1,600 metres (5,200 ft) of coastline.

At least the second wall, and possibly the first as well, were thinner than 1 foot (0.30 m) wide and not very tall. The role of this second wall was more visual than defensive. The city eventually expanded beyond the wall; for example, the wall cut through what would become the Sharq district.

The wall was repaired during the rule of Jaber I Al-Sabah to defend against an attack by Bandar Al-Saadoun. The last known historical reference to the second wall comes from 1887. It is possible the wall wore away due to natural deterioration, although it may also have been overtaken by rapid post-1890 urban growth and deliberately demolished, or that was both natural and deliberate deterioration. One Kuwaiti neighbourhood may have obtained its name from a gap that developed in the second wall.

== Third wall ==
Construction of the third wall

The outbreak of the Kuwait–Najd War saw fighting reach Kuwaiti-controlled territory not far from Kuwait town during the October 1920 Battle of Jahra. In response, Salim Al-Mubarak Al-Sabah ordered the construction of a new wall. Construction of the third wall began on 14 June during Ramadan. This wall extended 6,400 metres (21,000 ft). Given the context of the war, this wall was much stronger than previous iterations. It was 1.5 metres (4.9 ft) wide at its base and reached a height of 14 feet (4.3 m).

The third wall initially had four gates: Dasman (after the Dasman Palace, also referred to as Bneid Al-Gar after the Arabic word for pitch), Al-Shaab (now near the Awqaf Complex), Al-Shamia (after the local neighbourhood and also called Al-Naif after the nearby Naif Palace; now near the Ministry of Information), and Al-Jahra (named as it was situated on the road leading to Al Jahra). The early wooden gates were 4 metres (13 ft) high and 1.5 metres (4.9 ft) thick. Five large watchtowers were built along the wall's length, as well as 26 smaller towers. The slightly smaller Al-Maqsab gate ("slaughterhouse gate") was built later, to allow livestock to easily reach a newly built slaughterhouse. Each gate had a guardhouse which included sleeping quarters. The gates were opened after the morning prayer and closed after the evening prayer. The gates generally had between four and six guards. Some of the gates were rebuilt to have two layers in 1938.

Built to accommodate a substantially larger population and land area than previous walls, it was much longer and encompassed residential areas that had been built outside of the second wall. Together with a coastline of 5,600 metres (18,400 ft), the wall enclosed 7.5 square kilometres (2.9 sq mi). Its westernmost point lay in today's Al-Watiyah neighbourhood, while its easternmost point was in today's Ras Agouza area. The Al-Jahra gate served as a customs point for processing goods coming from Az Zubayr and other areas of Iraq. Al-Shamia had the same purpose for goods coming from Riyadh.

While they existed, the walls largely defined the development of the city. However, the discovery of oil was a turning point after which the city rapidly expanded beyond the third wall. The First Masterplan for Kuwait was created in 1951, and envisioned the creation of an urban area much larger than that within the third wall. The government approved the wall's demolition on 4 February 1957. While the wall was subsequently destroyed, its gates were preserved. Some of its length was replaced by the Al Soor Gardens.

All three walls were likely constructed from local earth. The clay and mudbrick third wall was encased in plaster. Their curved shapes have been compared to almonds, with the resulting city having an oval shape. There are possible records of other walls; however, the primary three are referred to as the first, second, and third.

== Legacy ==
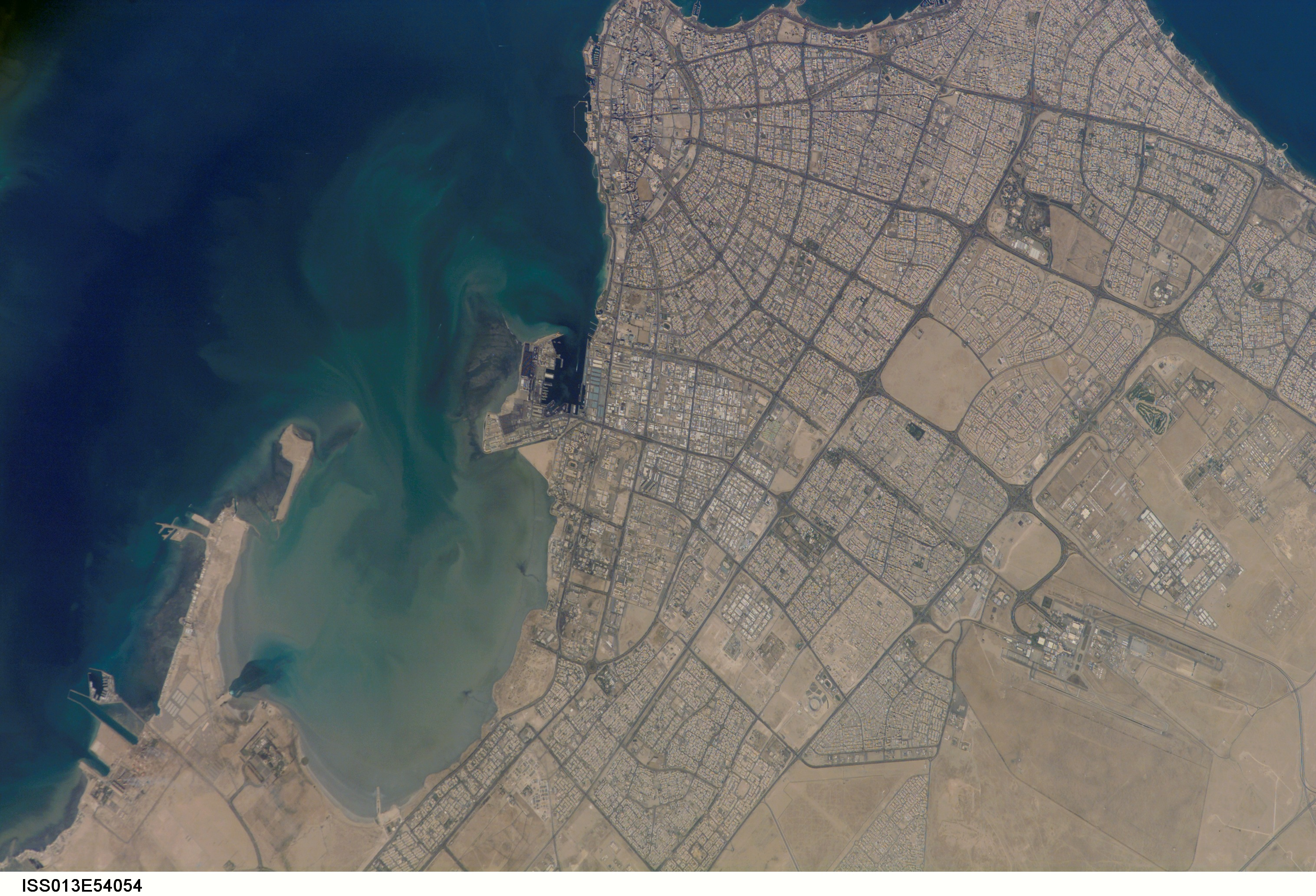
The rough path of the third wall is still visible as a semicircular ring road surrounding the old city (top middle)

The approximate route of the third wall remains the municipal boundary of the core of Kuwait City, which is now the location of a ring road. The wall's exact path is not precisely recorded. However, it is likely that Al-Soor Street (soor meaning "wall"), which runs inside of the ring road, traces at least some of the former wall. The sites of four of the gates (Al-Shaab, Al-Shamiya, Al-Jahra, and Al-Maqsab) are found along this road. The city inside the walls has been almost completely redeveloped, with most former residents moved to the suburbs and their former housing demolished. A 1984 report by the United States State Department mentions that only three gates remained. Ring roads established further out have reflected the semicircular pattern of the first. The expansion of the city has resulted in the area once within the third wall now making up just 4% of the city's urban area.

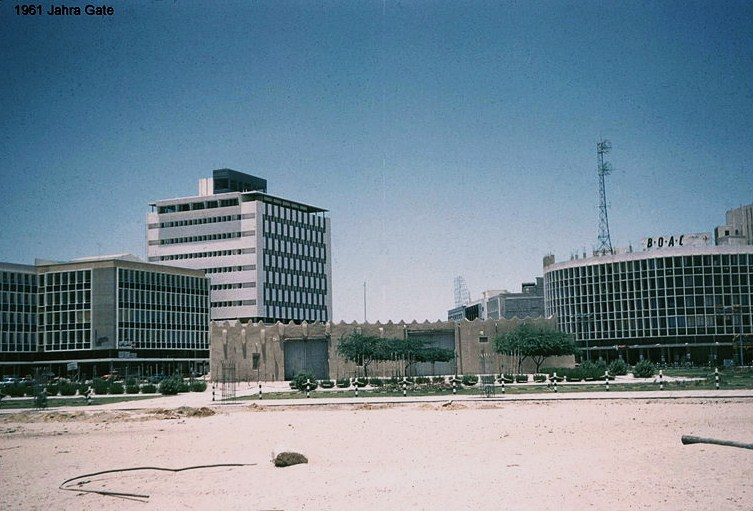
The Al-Jahra gate in 1961

The construction of the third wall is an important date for Kuwaiti nationality law, as it marks the point after which later arrivals and their descendents are no longer automatically considered citizens. Those from families with longer histories in the region are referred to as ahl Al-sur ("people of the wall"). The wall inspired the name of Al-Soor, a nationalistic television channel founded in 2009.

There is limited public awareness of the walls today, including of the surviving gate remains. However, the walls have seen growing mention in some modern literature, including in a story by Abdullah Albsais in which the first wall objects to its demolition.
