= Hassan's Optician =

Hassan's Optician Company
- Industry: Retail, Wholesale
- Founded: Kuwait City, Kuwait (1951)
- Founder: Dr. Hassan Saadat Yazdi
- Headquarters: Kuwait City, Kuwait
- Area served: Middle East
- Key people: Hassan Saadat Yazdi(Founder/Owner); Kian Saadat Yazdi (CEO)
- Products: Eyewear, Hearing aid, Jewellery and Biomedical Equipment.
- Website: www.hassans.com

Hassan's Optician Co. is a retail/wholesale company of eyewear, hearing aid, biomedical Equipment, and jewellery. It is primarily based in Kuwait with branches in Oman and the United Arab Emirates.

== History ==
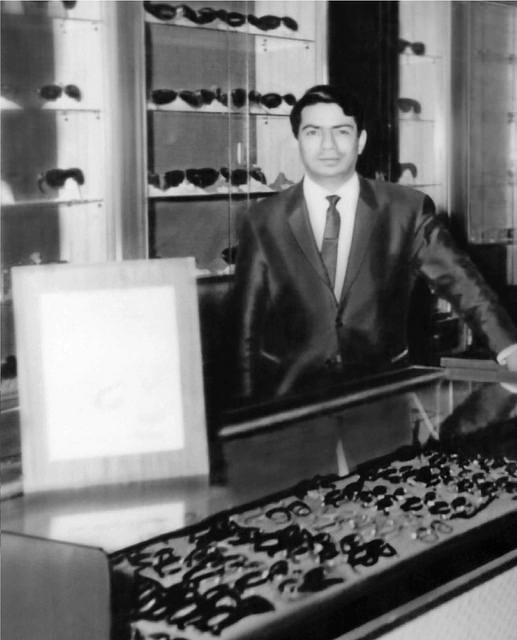
Hassan Saadat Yazdi at his first store in Sharq, Kuwait (1951)

Hassan's Optician Co. is a Kuwait-based optical and healthcare company founded in 1951 by Dr. Hassan Saadat Yazdi, an optometrist originally from Tehran, Iran. The company began operations in Sharq, Kuwait, and in 1960 became the first optician store officially approved by the Kuwaiti Department of Health. Since its founding, the company has expanded to operate more than 40 branches across Kuwait and the United Arab Emirates (UAE).

=== 1980s to 2000s ===
By 1987, the company expanded its services to include Hassan’s Hearing Care Centre, and later, in 1993, began to offer hearing-aid services in Oman.

Also in 1993, the company opened its first jewellery branch in Kuwait. Seven years later, Hassan’s Optician entered into partnerships with eyewear brands Luxottica and Ray-Ban.

=== 2010s to present ===
The company later established the Eye Boutique in Kuwait and the United Arab Emirates in 2012, began operating Yessayan Jewellery in 2015, and launched Hassan's Biomedical Co. in 2017. The launch of the biomedical operation included the establishment of a Zeiss lens factory in Kuwait.

In 2021, the company opened its first dental clinic in Kuwait City, Jibla Clinic. In 2024, it opened a flagship store incorporating Hassan’s Optician and Hearing Care services.

Dr. Hassan Yazdi contributed to industry changes such as the country’s first lens-grinding machine, enabling local production of prescription lenses and reducing reliance on imports.
