= InterContinental Kuwait Downtown =

Planned hotel in Kuwait City, Kuwait

Coordinates: 29.369607°N 47.978072°E

The InterContinental Kuwait Downtown was a planned InterContinental hotel in Kuwait City, Kuwait. Announced in 2012, it was scheduled for completion in early 2015. It was to be located in close proximity to the government and business centre of the city. The hotel would have contained 200 rooms: 120 king rooms, 60 twin rooms and 20 deluxe suites, as well as conference facilities and a banquet hall covering over 600 square metres (6,500 sq ft).

== See also ==
- List of tallest buildings in Kuwait
