= Al Tijaria Tower =

Skyscraper in Kuwait

- Burj altijaria
- Location within Kuwait

General information
- Status: Completed
- Type: Offices, shopping mall
- Location: Soor Street, Sharq, Kuwait, Kuwait City, Kuwait
- Coordinates: 29.3705°N 47.9919°E
- Construction started: 2005
- Completed: 2009
- Inaugurated: 2009
- Cost: $122 million
- Owner: The Commercial Real Estate Company

Height
- Architectural: 218 m (715 ft)
- Tip: 218 m (715 ft)
- Top floor: 158 m (518 ft)

Technical details
- Floor count: 41
- Lifts/elevators: 8

Design and construction
- Architecture firm: Al-Jazera Consultants, NORR Group

Other information
- Parking: 740

Website
- www.altijaria.com/projects/1

Al Tijaria Tower (Arabic: برج التجارية) is a skyscraper in Sharq, Kuwait. The tower is characterized by a two degree wrap between one floor and the other.

== Profile ==
The tower is located across from the Al Shaheed Park, the building area is 4,293.6 m^{2} (46,216 sq ft).

The form of Al Tijaria Tower (also known as the Kuwait Trade Center) is inspired by a spiral or helix. The body of the tower “twists” by 80 degrees as it climbs from the ground level to the top-most occupied floor. The tower plate is organized with a circular-shaped core located in the center of the floor. A concentric ring of structural columns allows for variation in slab edge location while keeping columns vertically aligned from floor to floor. This slab edge adjustment creates a twisted exterior massing for the tower. The tower features internal, vertically stacked, six-story-high atrium gardens rising through the height of the tower. The stacked atrium gardens spin around the center of the plate, creating a dynamic twisted space rising through the tower.

The exterior cladding design of the tower is a smooth aluminum and glass unitized curtain wall system. Materials include insulated blue-tinted vision and spandrel glass with selected use of silver aluminum panels. Glazing the atrium is insulated “clear” low-E glass (with custom ceramic frit pattern to control solar heat gain) supported by a stainless steel point-fixation system. Contrasting the tower, the podium is clad in a combination of natural stone and pre-cast concrete.

The Tower is composed of a five-story podium shopping mall, with an open-to-sky garden terrace on the podium roof, and an office tower rising above. The structural system of the shopping mall is a waffle slab with columns located on a 9 m × 9 m (30 ft × 30 ft) grid. Office floors are reinforced concrete slabs supported on structural steel beams. The floor plates rotate 2.0 degrees clockwise as they rise. Horizontal stability was provided using a number of strong core walls together with a 21 m (69 ft) diameter core wall in the tower area. The twelve equally-spaced tower columns are reinforced concrete, or composite with steel built up sections.

== See also ==
- List of tallest buildings in Kuwait
