= Assima Mall =

- Ala'assima Mall
- Location within Kuwait

General information
- Status: Completed
- Type: Shopping mall
- Location: Sharq, Kuwait, Kuwait City, Kuwait
- Coordinates: 29.3734°N 47.9870°E
- Construction started: October 2015
- Completed: November 2021
- Inaugurated: 8 November 2021
- Cost: $713 million
- Owner: The Salhia Real Estate Company

Height
- Architectural: 380 m (1,250 ft)
- Tip: 380 m (1,250 ft)

Technical details
- Floor count: 7

Website
- theassima.com

Assima Mall (Arabic: مول العاصمة) is a shopping mall in Sharq, Kuwait. It is the largest commercial project within the city, and was opened on 8 November 2021.

The Capital Complex includes the largest mall in Kuwait City. Assima Mall includes a cinema, gym, spa, and entertainment, as well as numerous dining options throughout the mall.
