= Jackie Kazarian =

American painter

- Born: Jackie Kazarian; Chicago, Illinois, U.S.
- Education: School of the Art Institute of Chicago
- Alma mater: Duke University
- Known for: Painting, video art, installation art

Jackie Kazarian (Armenian: Ջեքի Ղազարյան), is an American painter, video artist, and installation artist of Armenian descent.

== Life ==
=== Ancestors ===
Kazarian's grandfathers, Abram Bedrosian (Adana) and Kazar Kazarian (Tadem), both left Western Armenia before 1915. They were from Sivas, Marash, Tadem and Adana. Kazarian's grandmother was Mariam Betlezian, and her father was a linguist professor and was taken and killed by Ottoman soldiers. Mariam's mother feared that her teen daughter would be abducted and/or enslaved, so placed her in an orphanage before she fled with her younger children. Mariam eventually left the orphanage to become an immigrant bride to Kazar Kazarian and lived her life in Waukegan, Illinois.

Kazarian's other grandmother, Elmas Shahinian, was well-educated and came from a wealthy family in Sivas. Her grandfather owned a flour mill in Sivas, and lived with 22 family members and servants in a house that is now a post office. When the home was confiscated by Ottoman soldiers, most of her family members were killed, but her father and uncle were spared for a while to run the mill. Eventually, they were also killed. Elmas became a young manager of a Sivas orphanage and went back to her home every week to give piano lessons to the Turkish captain's wife in exchange for flour to feed her mother and brother, who were living on the street. She eventually emigrated to the U.S. with them and lived the rest of her life in Milwaukee, WI.

=== Education ===
Kazarian was born in Chicago. In 1981 she graduated from Duke University, Durham, North Carolina, and in 1989 graduated with an MFA from the School of the Art Institute of Chicago.

From 1984–1990 Kazarian worked in Encyclopædia Britannica and from 1988 – 2005 she worked at the Chicago Art Institute.

== Project 1915 ==
In 2015 to promote awareness of the culture and the tragedy, Kazarian created her work Armenia (Hayasdan) for the 100th anniversary of the Armenian genocide. The work was partly inspired by Picasso's "Guernica." Kazarian's painting is oriented in a way to reflect the view of Ararat and the names of the cities as if one is standing in historic Armenia and looking east. The orientation also refers to the ancient Christian maps (called TO maps), with east at the top of the map, north to the left. The needle lace used in the painting and the praying hands at the base of the painting is from Kazarian's grandmother, Mariam Betlezian, who was from Marash. The work will be displayed for the first time in Chicago's Mana Contemporary from April 17 to May 29.

== Exhibitions ==
- 2018 Modern Art Museum in Sharq, Kuwait
- 2012 Abraçades (Hugs), Bellvitge Art, Hospitalet de Llobregat, Barcelona, Spain
- 2010 Expect Nothing: New Works by Jackie Kazarian, Chicago Cultural Center
  - Jackie Kazarian, Aleppo Women’s Art Festival
  - Jackie Kazarian, Damascus, Syria
  - Jackie Kazarian, Lattakia, Syria
- 2009 Jackie Kazarian, Union League Club of Chicago
- 2008 Jackie Kazarian, exhale, Alfedena Gallery, Chicago
  - Jackie Kazarian: breath, Stubbs, Chicago
  - Jackie Kazarian, The Artist Project, Artropolis, Chicago
- 2007 Jackie Kazarian, The Artist Project, Artropolis, Chicago
- 2006 Focus 5, Illinois State Museum Gallery, Chicago
  - Gebben Gray Gallery, Fennville, MI
- 2004 Don't Blink, Three Arts Club, Chicago
- 1998 From Mariam's kitchen—the wallpaper series, Boyadjian Gallery,
  - AGBU Alex Manoogian Center, Pasadena, California
- 1996 Jackie Kazarian, The Garden Wall Papers, Klein Art Works, Chicago
- 1994 Klein Art Works, Chicago
- 1993 55 Mercer, New York City
  - Klein Art Works, Chicago
- 1991 Klein Art Works, Chicago
  - 1935 Gallery, Chicago

== Awards ==
- 2010 Visiting Artist, United States Embassy, Damascus, Syria
- 2008 Fellowship, Ellen Stone Belic Institute for the Study of Women & Gender in the Arts & Media, Columbia College Chicago
- 1996–2004 Advisory Board, Department of Cultural Affairs, Chicago
- 1998–2004 Exhibition Advisory Committee, Department of Cultural Affairs, Chicago
- 1997–2004 Grants Panelist (Chair), City Arts Program, City of Chicago
- 1991 Community Artist Assistance Program Grant, City of Chicago

== Bibliography ==
- Darrell Roberts, "Jackie Kazarian Mammoth Abstraction @ the Chicago Cultural Center," artexaminer.com,
- Karissa Lang, "Jackie Kazarian at Alfadena Gallery," Newcity Chicago, March 27, 2008.
- Lauren Weinberg, "Focus 5," Time Out Chicago, December 14–27, 2006.
- Leah Pietrusiak, "The Seldoms at Flatfile Galleries," Time Out Chicago, October 12–18.
- Alan Artner, "Preserving passing cultures, Momento Mori." Chicago Tribune, July 12, 2002.
- Richard Christiansen, "Memory lane joyfully leads to local libraries." Chicago Tribune, January 20, 2002.
- Lynn Van Matre, "At Hindsdale show, art is full bloom." Chicago Tribune, April 19, 2001
- Phil Smith, "Interior spaces still lives," Dialogue, September/October 2000.
- Laura Stoland, "Interior spaces still lives." New Art Examiner, September 2000.
- Janet Samuelian, "AGBU presents Chicago innovator, artist Jackie Kazarian." The Armenian Reporter International, August 8, 1998.
- "Openings." Art and Antiques. December 1994.
- Michael Muster, "Jackie Kazarian." New Art Examiner, April 1992.
- Kathryn Hixson, "Chicago in review." New Art Examiner, March 1992.
- Michael Bonesteel, "Ex-zoologist makes organic art." Lake Forester, January 24, 1991.

== See also ==
- List of Armenian artists
- List of Armenian women artists
