= Square Capital Tower =

Skyscraper in Kuwait City, Kuwait

- Interactive map of the Square Capital Tower area

General information
- Status: On-hold
- Location: Kuwait City, Kuwait
- Groundbreaking: 2005
- Construction started: 2005
- Construction stopped: 2009
- Opening: 2030
- Owner: Salhia Real Estate Company

Technical details
- Floor count: 54

The Square Capital Tower, also known as Assima Tower, is a skyscraper in Kuwait City, Kuwait.

== History ==
Originally in 2005, the tower was planned to be 376 m (1,234 ft) tall with designs by NORR Limited and interiors designs by Canadian firm John David Edison Interior Design Inc. It was also originally planned to contain offices in a 70-story tower, a five-star hotel in a mid-rise tower attached to its taller counterpart, and a spacious shopping mall. An underground garage will serve the project's parking needs.

The project began in 2005. But stopped in 2009, then resumed in 2015. Assima Mall was officially opened on 8 November 2021.

== See also ==
- Assima Mall
- List of tallest buildings in Kuwait
