= Gate of Kuwait =

Supertall skyscraper

Gate of Kuwait was a supertall skyscraper under construction in Kuwait City, Kuwait. The 84 storey, 320-metre (1,050 ft) building was planned to be used as a five-star hotel, office space, multi-storey car park, convention center and high-end retail space. The developer was Alshaya Group.

Initial plans for the project called for a 240-metre-high (790 ft) tower with a 40-metre-high (130 ft) Islamic arch. The intricately decorated arch, which featured geometric shapes and forms, was designed to reflect religious architectural elements found in Kuwait and Islam. However, a redesign saw the tower re-imagined as a slender 320-metre-high (1,050 ft) tower clad entirely in blue glass on the façade and steel panels on the side. The "gate" element was changed from a giant portal into a simple, smaller opening to create a far more contemporary composition. The renderings that were released with the redesign featured a Four Seasons logo on top of the tower and on the bottom of the renderings, indicating that the hotel portion of the tower will be the future home of Four Seasons Hotel Kuwait.

Asakheni Consulting Engineering was commissioned to work on the structural engineering design.

The construction of the building was never completed.

== See also ==
- List of tallest buildings in Kuwait
