= Abdulfattah Owainat =

Palestinian singer and songwriter (born 1972)

Abdulfattah Owainat عبد الفتاح عوينات
- Born: Abdul Fattah Abdullah Mohammad Owainat; 1972 (age 53–54); Kuwait City, Kuwait
- Genres: Arabic music
- Occupation: Singer
- Years active: 1987–present
- Label: New Sound Productions
- Website: www.abedelfattah.com

Abdul-Fattah Owainat (عبد الفتاح عوينات; born in Kuwait City, Kuwait in March 1972) is a Palestinian singer and songwriter best known for his songs on Palestinian Human Rights and their Right of Return as well as various recent uprisings in the Arab World.

== Career ==
Owainat studied Islamic Law and Principles at Zarqa Private University, Jordan. He debuted on the professional music scene at an early age, as one of the founders and original members of the "Al-Rawabi" band (in Arabic فرقة الروابي meaning the Hills), and began a solo career in 1987 while still an active member of the band as a vocalist, lyricist, musical composer and (formerly) artistic director.

He worked in several media production companies including Al-Amal for Media Services (in Arabic الأمل meaning Hope), Taif for Media Productions, and is currently working as part of the New Sound for Media Productions team as a production manager and supervisor.

He has participated in many concerts around the world including the Arab World (Kuwait, KSA, Bahrain, UAE, Qatar, Lebanon, Egypt, Sudan, Yemen, Algeria) as well as Turkey, Sweden, Italy, United Kingdom, Russia, Ukraine, France, Switzerland, Germany, and Canada and is considered one of the well-known artists especially in the Arab World. He also took part in the collaborative song "Hayat lil Alam"(Life for the World) alongside a number of well-known Singers from the Middle East & Gulf Area.

He was also a presenter on a program dedicated to other Muslim Artists and the Muslim Media on Al-Resalah Satellite TV.

== Awards ==
- In 2003 won the golden award for "Best song" for writing the music for "Amshi w droubi nar" sung by Meys Shalash at the 9th Cairo Festival for Radio and television
- In 2008 won the youth prize for service of Islamic work for his performances in an event organized by the Islamic Art Association in Bahrain.

== Discography ==
with Al-Rawabi

He made many recordings with the "Al-Rawabi" band including:

- "سلسلة الروابي الجهادي"
- "سلسلة الروابي الأفراح"
- "لحن الغربة"
- "رغم الحصار"
- "فرحة عُمُر"
- "سلام عليك"
- مسرحية "لوحات مقدسية"
- "زيتونة الأنبياء"
- "تحية وطن"
- "صقر الكتائب"
- "عياش والوطن"
- "أطيار السنونو"
- "نشيد الغضب"
- "صوت الحرية"
- "أسطورة جنين"
- "خنساء فلسطين"
- "عهد ووفاء"
- "غربة وطن"
- "لا تدمعي غزة"
- "أفراح يا ليلة"
- "أفراح يوم نجاحو"
- ألبوم "طالت ليالينا"

Solo albums

- Ya Msafer Oud (يا مسافر عود)
- Han el Watan (حن الوطن)
- Ahibboul Kheir (أحب الخير)

== See also ==
- Music of Palestine
