= Seif Palace =

Historical palace located in Kuwait

Al-Seif Palace
- قصر السيف
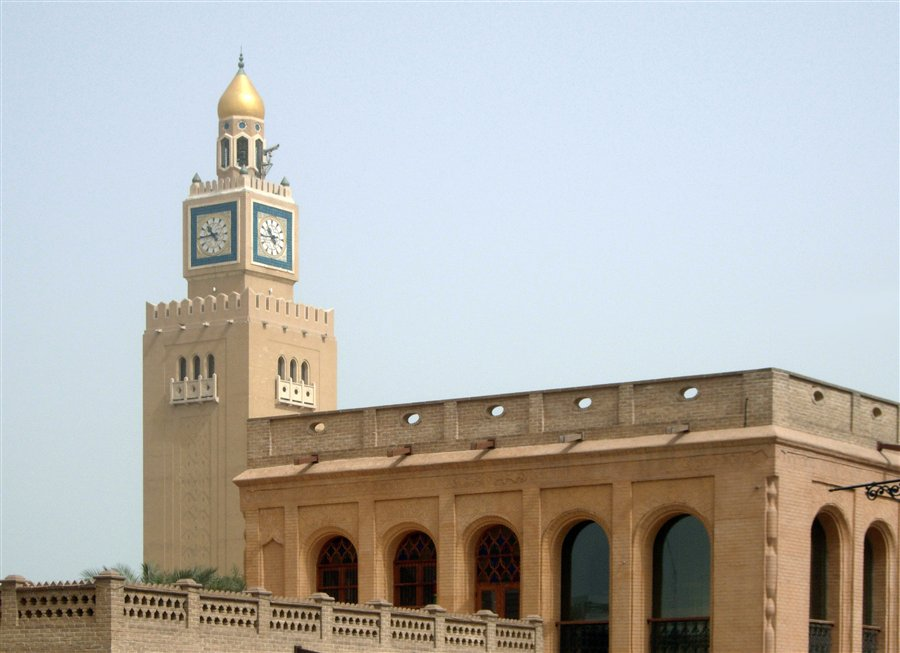
- The old seif palace with clock tower in the background
- Interactive map of the Al-Seif Palace area

General information
- Location: Kuwait City, Kuwait
- Coordinates: 29°22′51″N 47°58′16″E
- Groundbreaking: 1880
- Construction started: 1880
- Renovated: 1909, 1964, & 1987
- Owner: Government of Kuwait

References
- The official website of Aldiwan Alamiri.

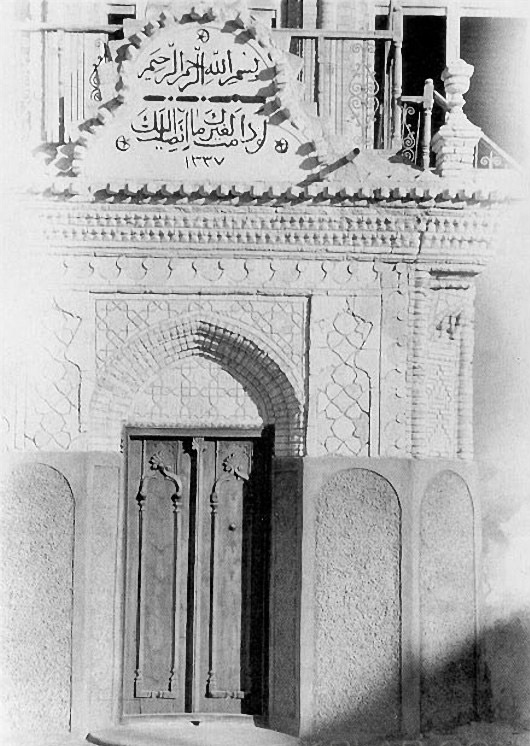
The door of the palace with the famous writing on top: "if it had lasted for others, it wouldn't have passed to you". It was placed in 1918.

Seif Palace (Arabic: قصر السيف) is a palace in Kuwait City, Kuwait. Located opposite the Grand Mosque, one of Seif Palace's best-known features is the watch tower, covered in blue tiles and with a roof plated in pure gold. Local materials such as clay, rocks, limestone, wood and metals were used in its construction.

== Overview ==
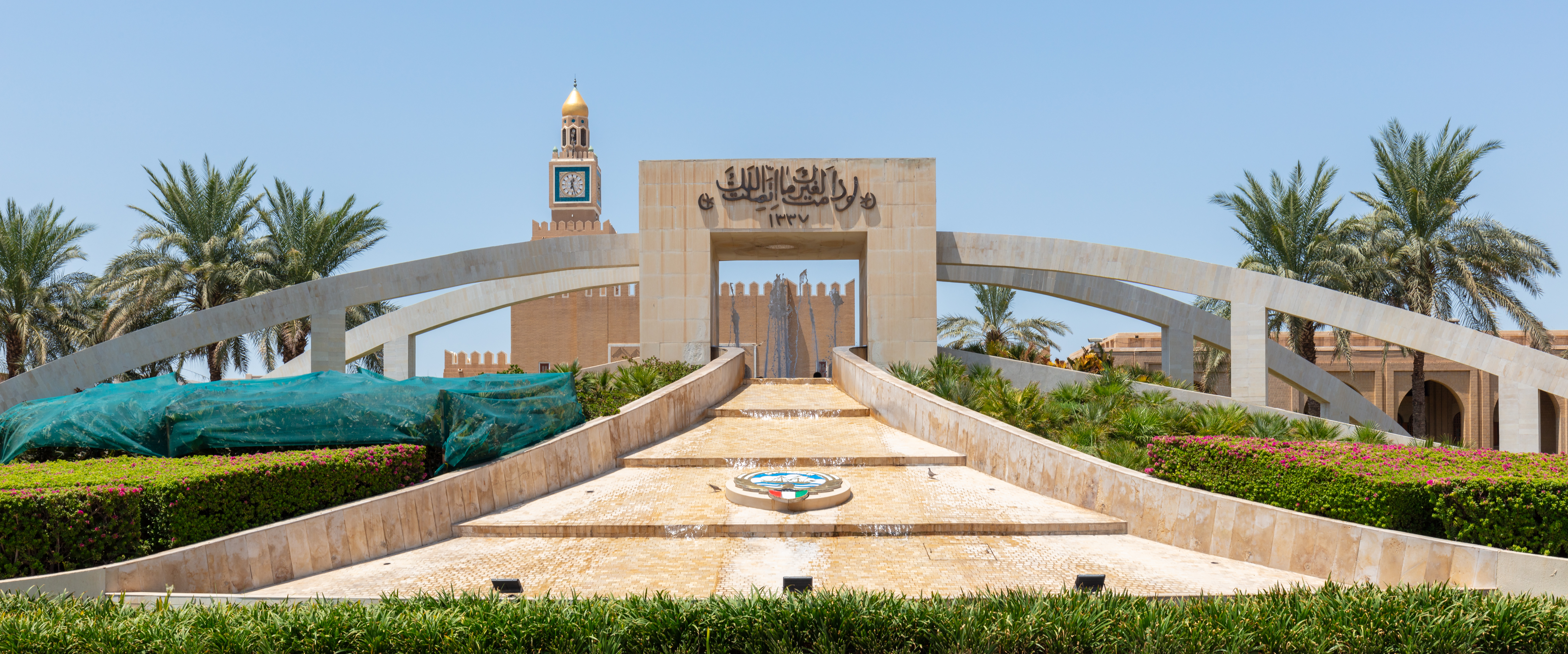
Front view of Seif Palace

The tower of the Seif Palace received a direct hit from an incoming missile during the first Gulf War (1990–91), which destroyed the dial room. British clockmaker Smith of Derby Group replaced the iconic clock, and were the only non-US company to be awarded a contract in this reconstructive period.

== See also ==
- Amiri Diwan of Kuwait
- Timeline of Kuwait City
