= Kuwait Direct Investment Promotion Authority =

Kuwait Direct Investment Promotion Authority (KDIPA) is a government agency established by the State of Kuwait for facilitating foreign direct investment into the country.

== History and operations ==
Kuwait Direct Investment Promotion Authority (KDIPA) was established in 2013. It is a governmental organization that advances economic diversification, growth, and Kuwait's global competitiveness. It was established in alignment with Kuwait's goal of diminishing its dependence on oil-generated revenues and broadening its economic base. The agency's objective is to streamline the investment process, simplify regulatory protocols, and deliver comprehensive support to foreign investors. KDIPA functions as a unified resource for foreign investors, extending aid throughout the investment lifecycle, commencing from initial inquiries to project realization.
