= Dar Al-Awadhi complex =

Coordinates: 29°22′54″N 47°59′13″E

- Interactive map of the Dar Al-Awadhi complex area

General information
- Location: Kuwait City, Kuwait
- Construction started: 2002
- Completed: 2005

Height
- Architectural: 171 m (561 ft)

Technical details
- Floor count: 35

Design and construction
- Architect: KEO International Consultants
- Main contractor: Ahmadiah Contracting and Trading Company

The Dar Al Awadhi complex is located in the capital of Kuwait. Located at the Ahmed Al Jaber Street near the corner with the Yousif Al Roumi Street in the Sharq district of Kuwait City, it consists of a commercial building and a 35-floor tower of 171 metres (561 ft) high. In was constructed during 2002–2005. As of 2026, it was the 14th tallest in Kuwait.

It is not to be confused with the Al Awadhi Tower in Fujairah.
