= Liberation Tower (Kuwait) =

Telecommunications tower in Kuwait City

Coordinates: 29°22′5.80″N 47°58′29.83″E

At 372 m, the Liberation Tower is the world's 38th tallest free-standing structure, by pinnacle height.

The Liberation Tower (Arabic: برج التحرير, romanized: Burj al-Taḥrīr) is a 372-meter-high or 1,220 feet tall telecommunications tower in Kuwait City, Kuwait. It is the second-tallest structure in the country and the 39th tallest building in the world. The tower is not publicly accessible to tourists. However, the complex building attached to the tower houses government offices such as the Communication and Information Technology Regulatory Authority and a government service center that offer civil services related to Ministry of Interior, Ministry of Foreign Affairs, Public Authority For Civil Information, Ministry of Justice, Public Institution for Social Security, Ministry of Commerce and Industry, Fire Service Directorate, and Ministry of Social Affairs and Labour.

Photo of the Liberation Tower

== History ==

Originally intended to be named The Kuwait Telecommunications Tower, construction of the tower commenced before the Iraqi invasion of Kuwait on August 2, 1990. When the invasion took place, construction, which was almost half-way complete, was put on hold. However, the structure received no damage, and construction resumed after Iraqi forces were expelled on February 27, 1991. Upon completion in 1993, the tower was renamed the Liberation Tower, symbolizing Kuwait's liberation from Iraq.

== Gallery ==

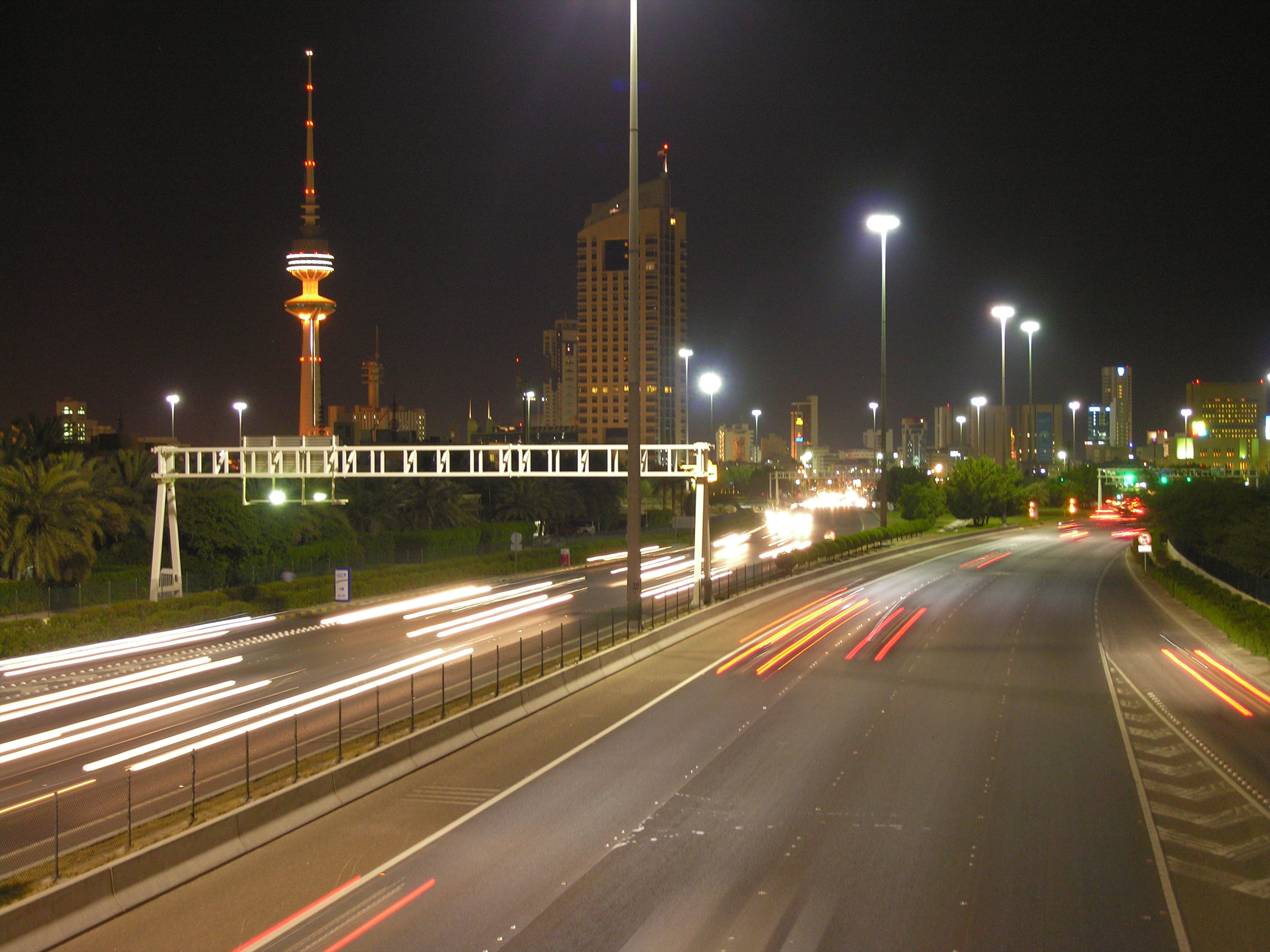

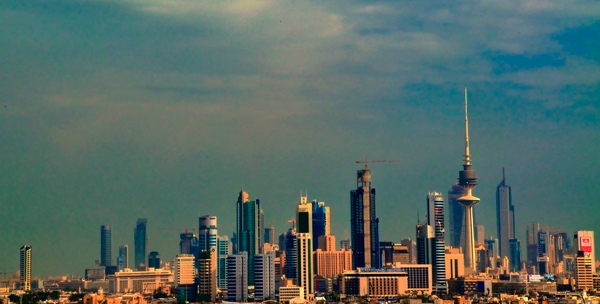

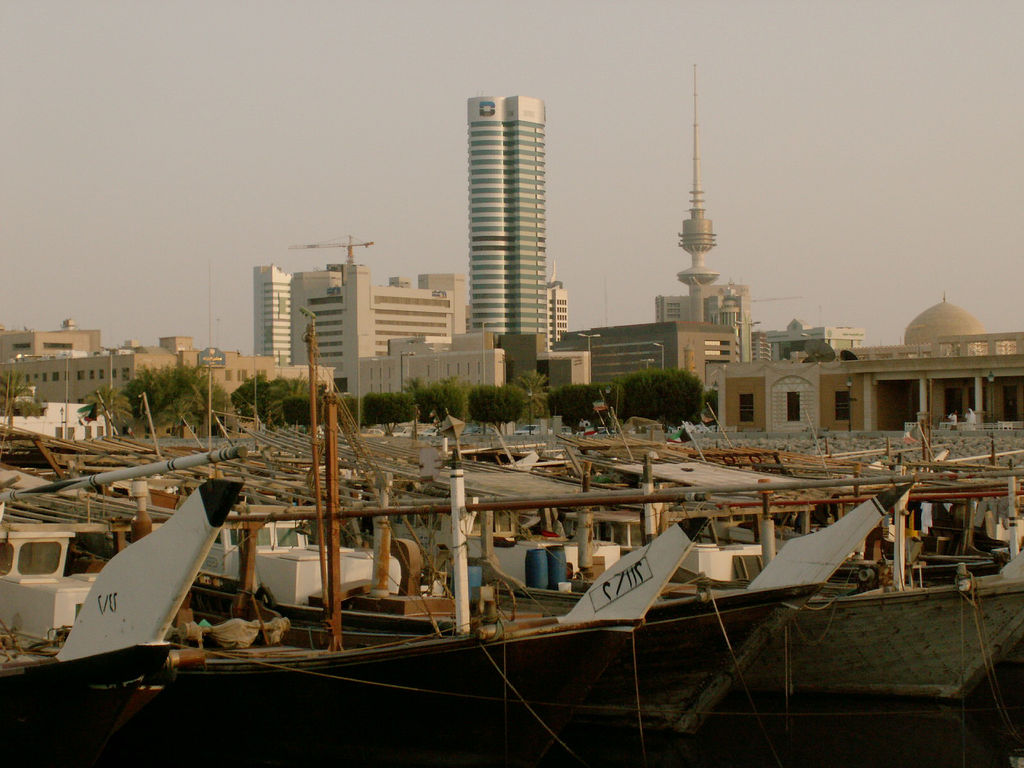

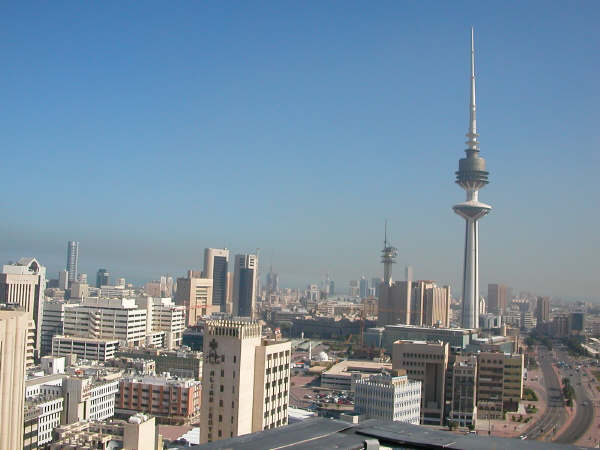

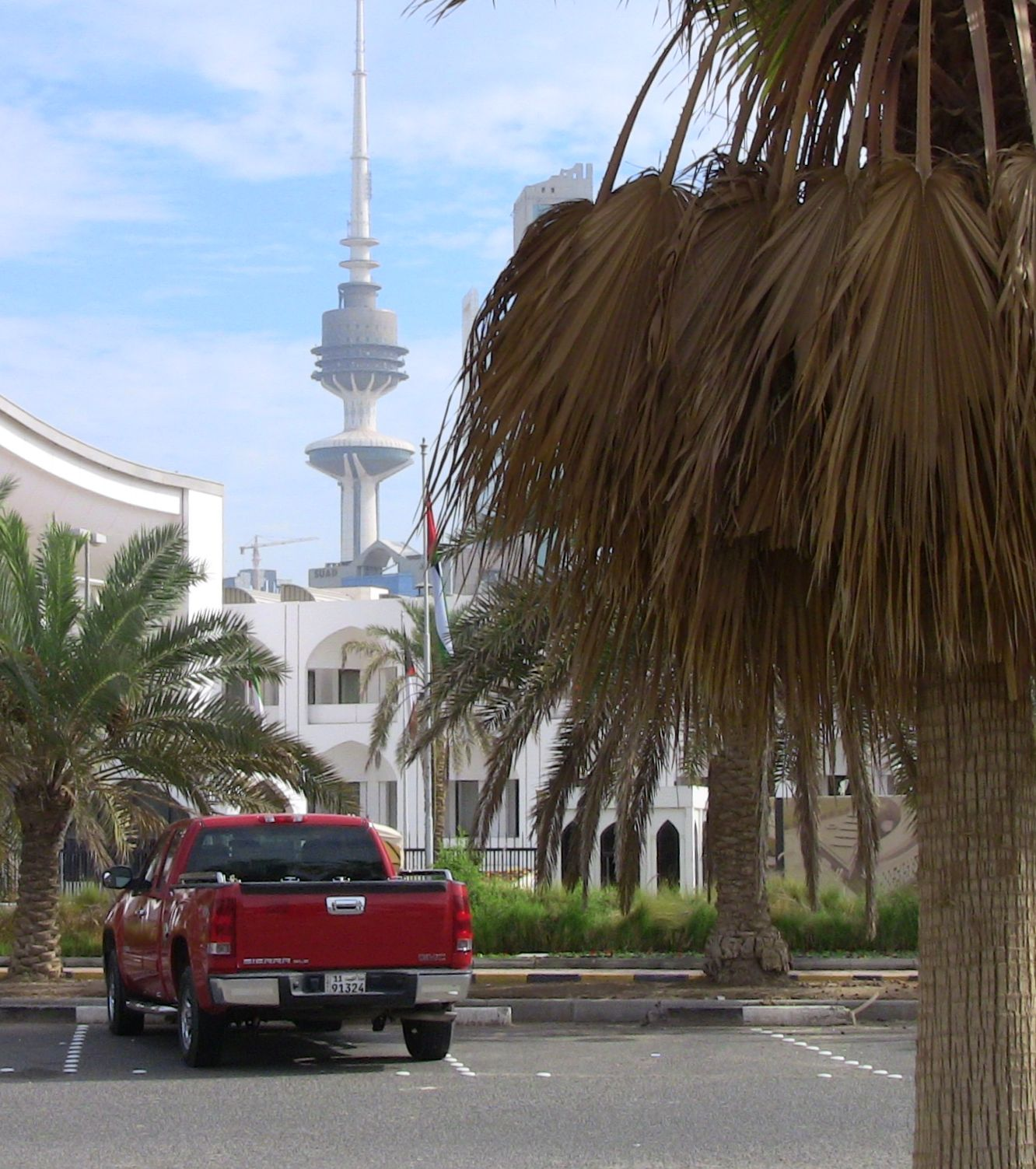

== See also ==
- List of tallest buildings in Kuwait
- List of tallest buildings and structures in the world
