= Sharq, Kuwait =

Sharq شرق
- District
- Interactive map of Sharq
- Location within Kuwait
- Coordinates: 29°23′N 47°59′E
- Country: Kuwait
- Governorate: Capital Governorate
- Elevation: 9 m (30 ft)

Population (2011)
  - Total: 14,708

Sharq (Arabic: شرق, romanized: Šarq, Persian: شرق, romanized: Šarġ) is a historic waterfront district of Kuwait City. It is Kuwait City's oldest neighborhood although most pre-oil buildings were demolished in the 1960s and 1970s. It is now a modern business area and contains many buildings, skyscrapers and malls such as the Souq Sharq, Dar Al-Awadhi complex, and Arraya Tower. Up until the 1950s, most 'Ajam resided Sharq.

== Embassies in Sharq ==
- Australia
