= Kuwait City =

Capital and largest city of Kuwait

Kuwait City مدينة الكويت Madīnat al-Kuwayt
- Capital city
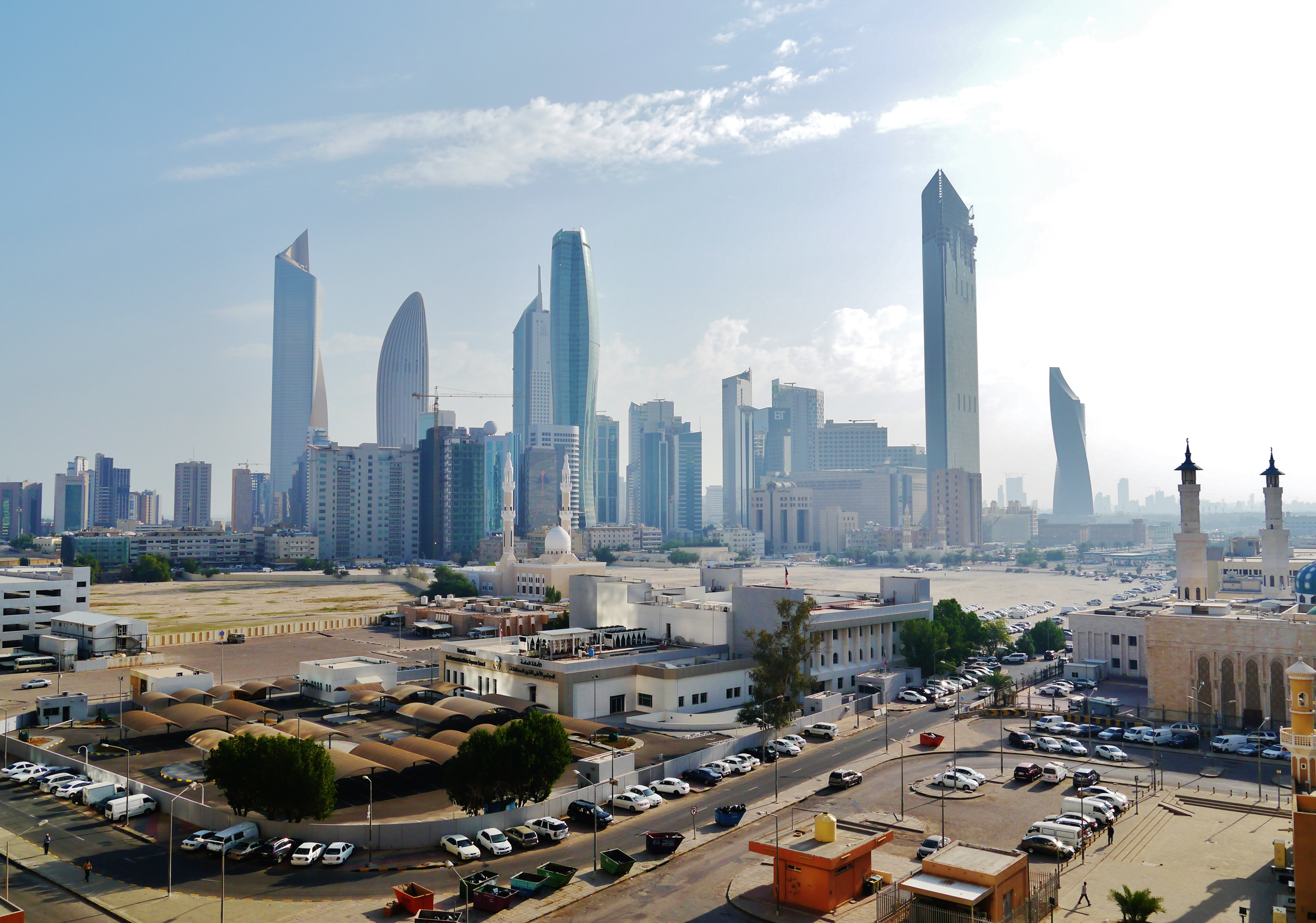
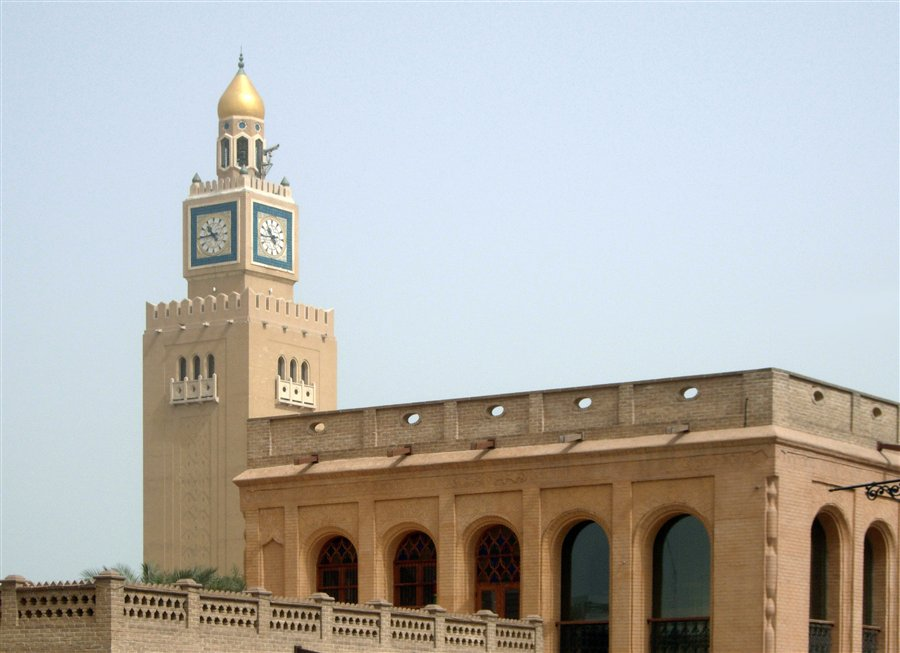
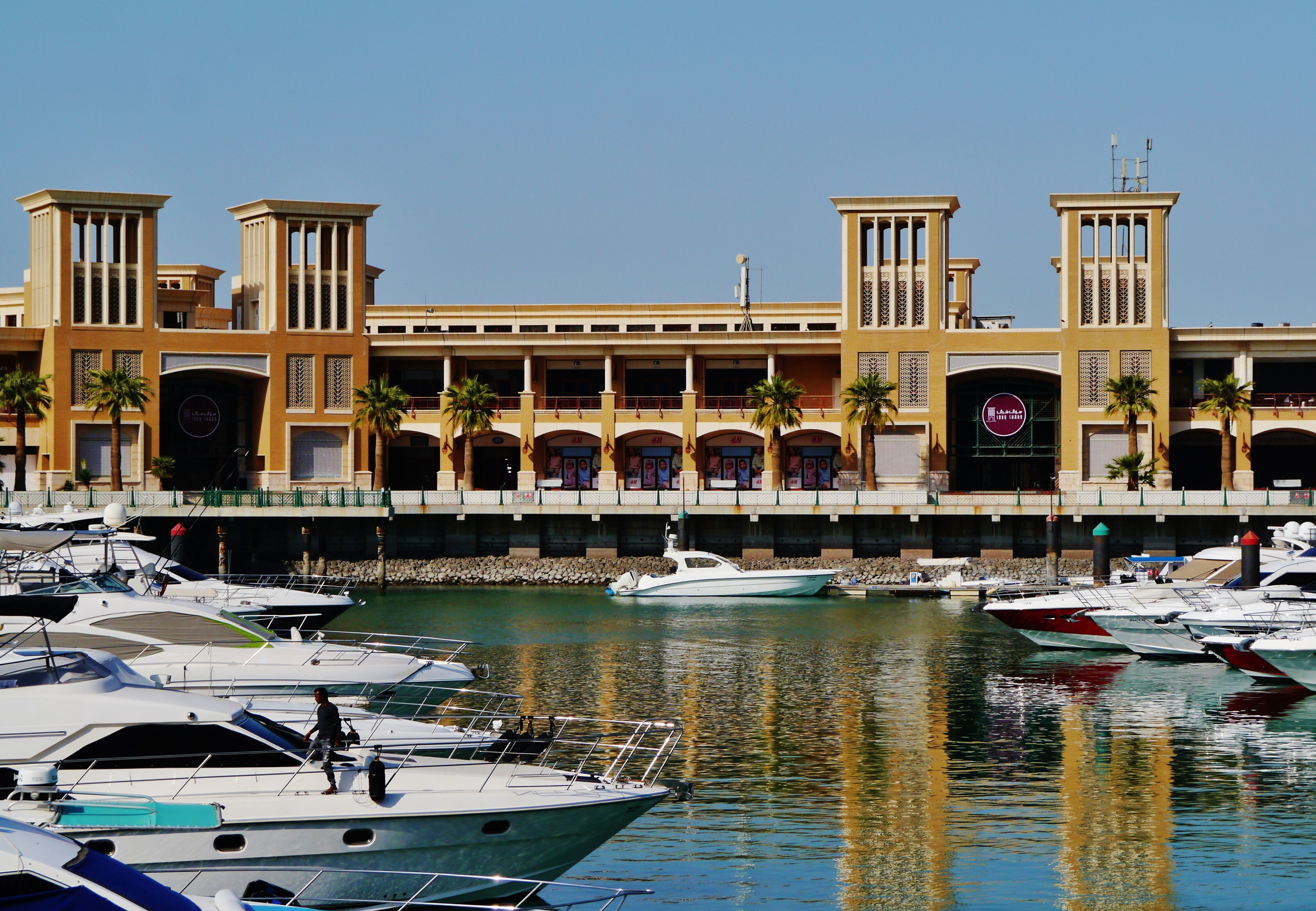
- Skyline of Kuwait City Al Hamra Tower Kuwait Towers Liberation Tower Seif Palace Souq Sharq From top left: Kuwait City skyline, Al Hamra Tower, Kuwait Towers, Seif Palace, Souq Sharq port Kuwait Downtown in 2012 Kuwait City Souq Sharq Marina

- Flag Seal
- Nickname: الديرة Ad-Dirah
- Location of Kuwait City in Kuwait Kuwait City (Asia)
- Coordinates: 29°22′11″N 47°58′42″E
- Country: Kuwait
- Governorate: Capital
- Established: 1752

Area
  - Capital city: 860 km^{2} (330 sq mi)

Population (2025)
  - Capital city: 3,405,000
  - Metro: 5,026,078
  - Metro density: 3,500/km^{2} (9,100/sq mi)
- Time zone: UTC+03:00 (AST)

Kuwait City (/kʊˈweɪt/; Arabic: مدينة الكويت, romanised: Madīnat al-Kuwayt) is the capital and largest city of Kuwait. Located at the heart of the country on the south shore of Kuwait Bay on the Persian Gulf, it is the political, cultural and economic primate city of the emirate, being home to the headquarters of most Kuwaiti corporations and the entirety of its banking system.

As of 2018, the metropolitan area had roughly three million inhabitants (more than 70% of the country's population). The city itself has no administrative status. All six governorates of the country contain parts of the urban agglomeration, which is subdivided into numerous areas. In a narrower sense, Kuwait City can also refer only to the town's historic core, which is part of the Capital Governorate and seamlessly merges with the adjacent urban areas.

Kuwait City's trade and transportation needs are served by Kuwait International Airport, Mina Al-Shuwaikh (Shuwaikh Port) and Mina Al Ahmadi (Ahmadi Port).

== History ==
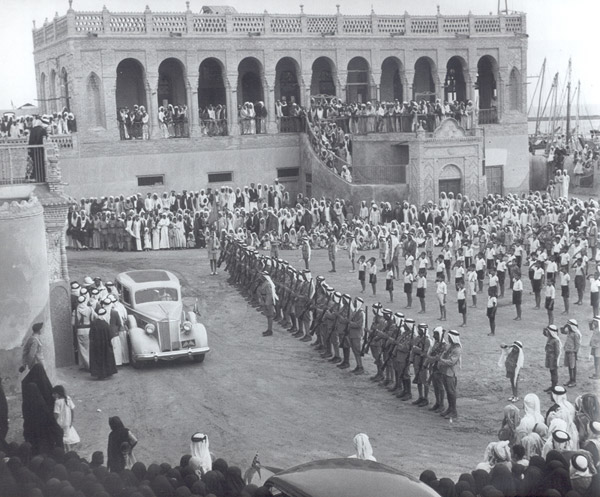
Celebration at Seif Palace in 1944 for Sheikh Ahmad Al-Jaber Al-Sabah

In the early to mid 1700s, Kuwait City was a small fishing village. Sometime in the mid 1700s, the Bani Utubs settled in Kuwait. At the time of the arrival of the Utubs, Kuwait was inhabited by a few fishermen. In the eighteenth century, Kuwait gradually became a principal commercial centre for the transit of goods between India, Muscat, Baghdad, Persia, and Arabia. By the late 1700s, Kuwait had already established itself as a trading route from the Persian Gulf to Aleppo.

During the Persian siege of Basra in 1775–1779, Iraqi merchants took refuge in Kuwait and were partly instrumental in the expansion of Kuwait's boat-building and trading activities. As a result, Kuwait's maritime commerce boomed. Between the years 1775 and 1779, the Indian trade routes with Baghdad, Aleppo, Smyrna and Constantinople were diverted to Kuwait. The East India Company was diverted to Kuwait in 1792. The East India Company secured the sea routes between Kuwait, India and the east coasts of Africa. After the Persian withdrawal from Basra in 1779, Kuwait continued to attract trade away from Basra.

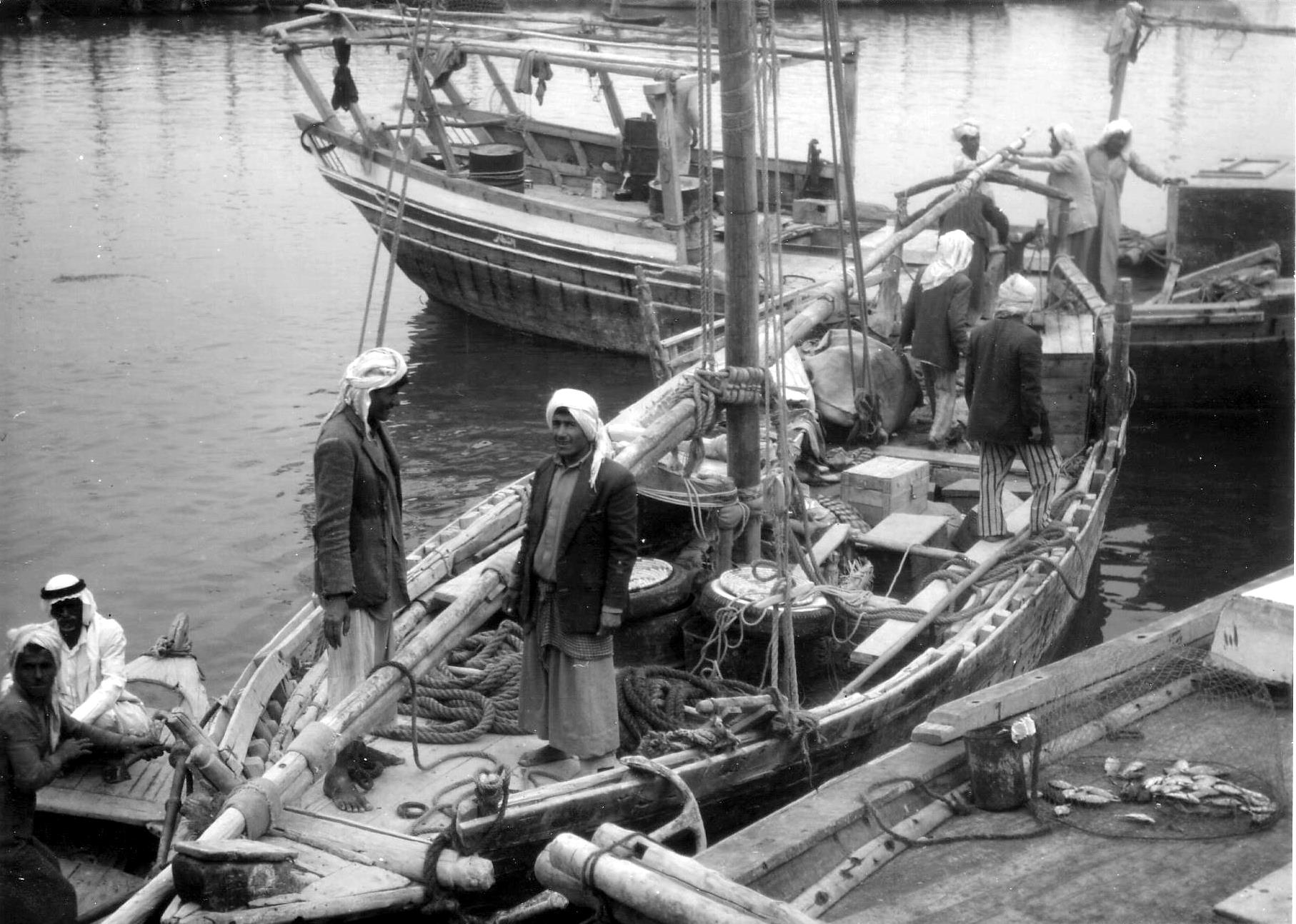
Kuwait harbour in 1961

Kuwait was the centre of boat building in the Persian Gulf region. During the late eighteenth and nineteenth centuries, ship vessels made in Kuwait carried the bulk of trade between the ports of India, East Africa and the Red Sea. Kuwaiti ship vessels were renowned throughout the Indian Ocean. Regional geopolitical turbulence helped foster economic prosperity in Kuwait in the second half of the 18th century. Kuwait became prosperous due to Basra's instability in the late 18th century. At the time, Kuwait functioned partly as a haven for Basra's merchants fleeing Ottoman persecution. According to Palgrave, Kuwaitis developed a reputation as the best sailors in the Persian Gulf.

During the reign of Mubarak Al-Sabah, Kuwait was dubbed the "Marseille of the Gulf" because its economic vitality attracted a large variety of people. In the first decades of the twentieth century, Kuwait had a well-established elite: wealthy trading families who were linked by marriage and shared economic interests.

In 1937, Freya Stark wrote about the extent of poverty in Kuwait at the time:

Poverty has settled in Kuwait more heavily since my last visit five years ago, both by sea, where the pearl trade continues to decline, and by land, where the blockade established by Saudi Arabia now harms the merchants.

Some prominent merchant families left Kuwait in the early 1930s due to the prevalence of economic hardship. At the time of the discovery of oil in 1937, most of Kuwait's inhabitants were impoverished.

From 1946 to 1982, Kuwait experienced a period of prosperity driven by oil and its liberal atmosphere. In popular discourse, the years between 1946 and 1982 are referred to as the "Golden Era". In 1950, a major public-works programme began to enable Kuwaitis to enjoy a modern standard of living. By 1952, the country became the largest oil exporter in the Persian Gulf region. In the following year, the country's annual oil income grew to $169 million. This massive growth attracted many foreign workers, especially from Jordan, Egypt and India and helped finance the development of a new master plan, which the state approved in 1952. In June 1961, Kuwait became independent with the end of the British protectorate and the sheikh Abdullah Al-Salim Al-Sabah became an Emir. Under the terms of the newly drafted constitution, Kuwait held its first parliamentary elections in 1963. Kuwait was the first Persian Gulf country to establish a constitution and parliament.

In the 1960s and 1970s, Kuwait was the most developed country in the region. Kuwait was the pioneer in the Middle East in diversifying its earnings away from oil exports. The Kuwait Investment Authority is the world's first sovereign wealth fund. From the 1970s onward, Kuwait scored highest of all Arab countries on the Human Development Index. Kuwait University was established in 1966. Kuwait's theatre industry was well-known throughout the Arab world. In the 1960s and 1970s, Kuwait's press was described as one of the freest in the world. Kuwait was the pioneer in the literary renaissance in the Arab region. In 1958, Al Arabi magazine was first published, the magazine went on to become the most popular magazine in the Arab world. Many Arab writers moved to Kuwait for freedom of expression because Kuwait had greater freedom of expression than elsewhere in the Arab world. Kuwait was a haven for writers and journalists from all parts of the Middle East, with the Iraqi poet Ahmed Matar leaving Iraq in the 1970s to take refuge in the more liberal environment of Kuwait.

Kuwaiti society embraced liberal and Western attitudes throughout the 1960s and 1970s. Most Kuwaiti women did not wear the hijab in the 1960s and 1970s. At Kuwait University, mini-skirts were more common than the hijab.

In the early 1980s, Kuwait experienced a major economic crisis after the Souk Al-Manakh stock market crash and decrease in oil price.

The Kuwait National Assembly Building, a parliament building designed by the works of Jørn Utzon in its elements of Islamic architecture, was completed in 1982 by orders of his son Jan Utzon.

During the Iran–Iraq War, Kuwait supported Iraq. Throughout the 1980s, there were several terror attacks in Kuwait, including the 1983 Kuwait bombings, hijacking of several Kuwait Airways planes and attempted assassination of Emir Jaber in 1985. Kuwait was a leading regional hub of science and technology in the 1960s and 1970s up until the early 1980s, the scientific research sector significantly suffered due to the terror attacks.

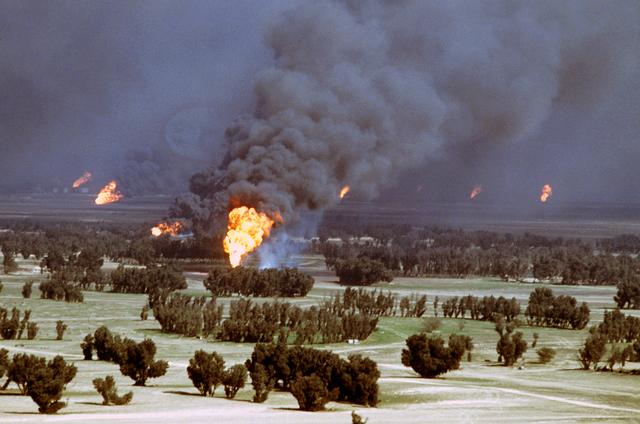
Oil fires in Kuwait in 1990, which were a result of the scorched earth policy of Iraqi military forces retreating from Kuwait.

The Kuwaiti government strongly advocated Islamism throughout the 1980s. At that time, the most serious threat to the continuity of Al Sabah came from home-grown secular democrats. The secular Kuwaiti opposition were protesting the 1976 suspension of the parliament. Al Sabah were attracted to Islamists preaching the virtues of a hierarchical order that included loyalty to the Kuwaiti monarchy. In 1981, the Kuwaiti government gerrymandered electoral districts in favour of the Islamists. Islamists were the government's main allies, hence Islamists were able to colonise state agencies, such as the government ministries. By the mid-1980s, Kuwait was described as an autocracy. In 1986, Emir Jaber suspended the parliament.

The Kuwait Towers were officially opened in March 1979 and are considered a historical monument and a symbol of modern Kuwait.

After the Iran–Iraq War ended, Kuwait declined an Iraqi request to forgive its US$65 billion debt. An economic rivalry between the two countries ensued after Kuwait increased its oil production by 40 percent. Tensions between the two countries increased further in July 1990, after Iraq complained to OPEC claiming that Kuwait was stealing its oil from a field near the Iraq–Kuwait border by slant drilling of the Rumaila field. In August 1990, Iraqi forces invaded and annexed Kuwait. After a series of failed diplomatic negotiations, the United States led a coalition to remove the Iraqi forces from Kuwait, in what became known as the Gulf War. On 26 February 1991, the coalition succeeded in driving out the Iraqi forces. As they retreated, Iraqi forces carried out a scorched earth policy by setting oil wells on fire. During the Iraqi occupation, more than 1,000 Kuwaiti civilians were killed. In addition, more than 600 Kuwaitis went missing during Iraq's occupation, approximately 375 remains were found in mass graves in Iraq.

In March 2003, Kuwait became the springboard for the US-led invasion of Iraq. Upon the death of the Emir Jaber, in January 2006, Saad Al-Sabah succeeded him but was removed nine days later by the Kuwaiti parliament due to his ailing health. Sabah Al-Sabah was sworn in as Emir.

On February 28, 2026, following Operation Epic Fury, Iran struck Kuwait and its neighboring countries, damaging, among others, the city's airport, the PIFSS tower, the ministries complex, oil refineries and desalination plants.

== Geography ==
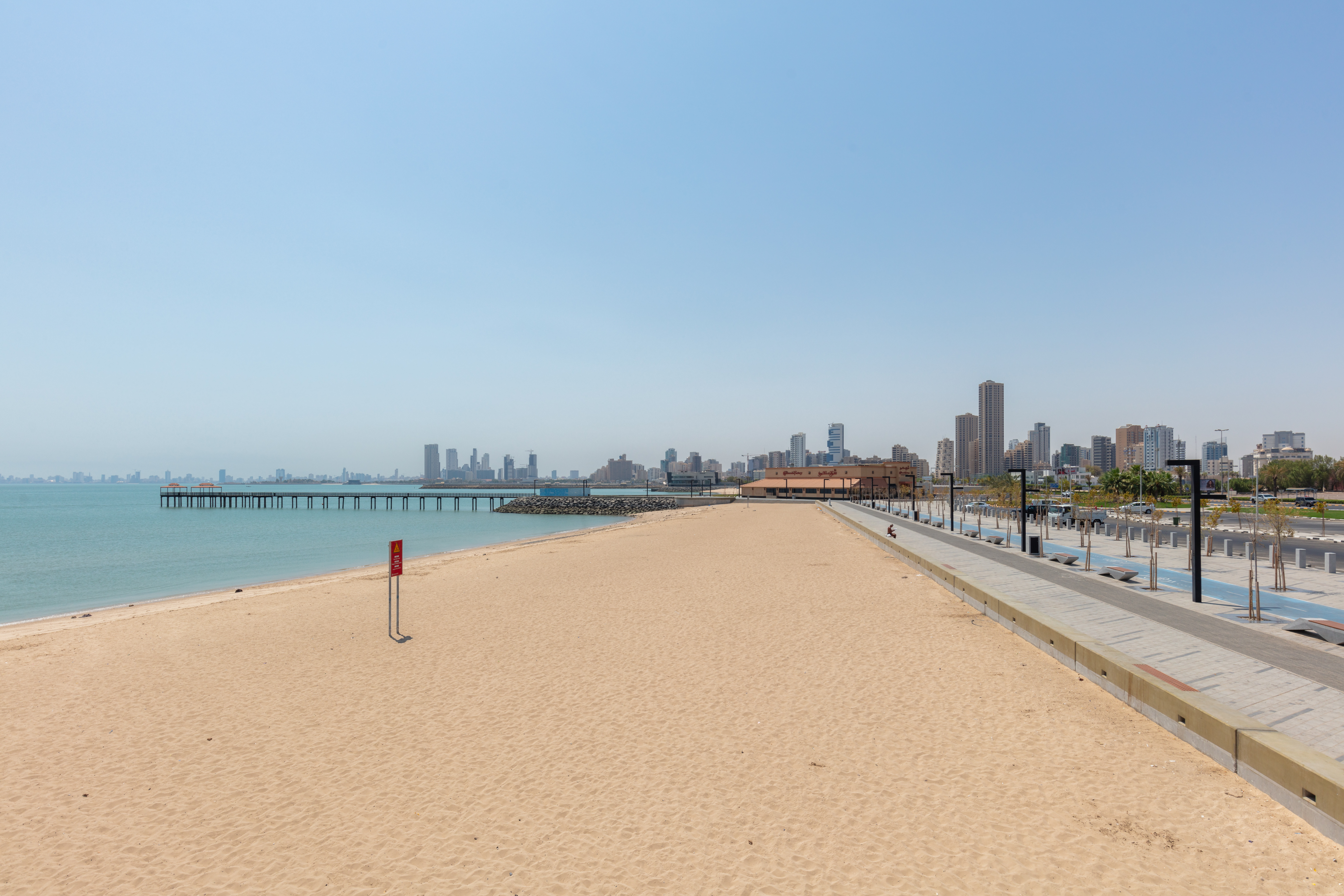
Playa Dasman

Kuwait City is located on Kuwait Bay, a natural deep-water harbor. Ninety percent of Kuwait's population lives within the Kuwait Bay coast. The country is generally low-lying, with the highest point being 306 m (1,004 ft) above sea level. It has nine islands, all of which, with the exception of Failaka Island, are uninhabited. With an area of 860 km^{2} (330 mi^{2}), Bubiyan is the largest island in Kuwait and is connected to the rest of the country by a 2,380-metre-long (7,808 ft) bridge. The land area is considered arable and sparse vegetation is found along its 499-kilometre-long (310 mi) coastline.

Kuwait's Burgan field has a total capacity of approximately 70 billion barrels (1.1×10^{10} m^{3}) of proven oil reserves. During the 1991 Kuwaiti oil fires, more than 500 oil lakes were created covering a combined surface area of about 35.7 km^{2} (13.8 mi^{2}). The resulting soil contamination due to oil and soot accumulation had made eastern and south-eastern parts of Kuwait uninhabitable. Sand and oil residue had reduced large parts of the Kuwaiti desert to semi-asphalt surfaces. The oil spills during the Gulf War also drastically affected Kuwait's marine resources.

=== Climate ===
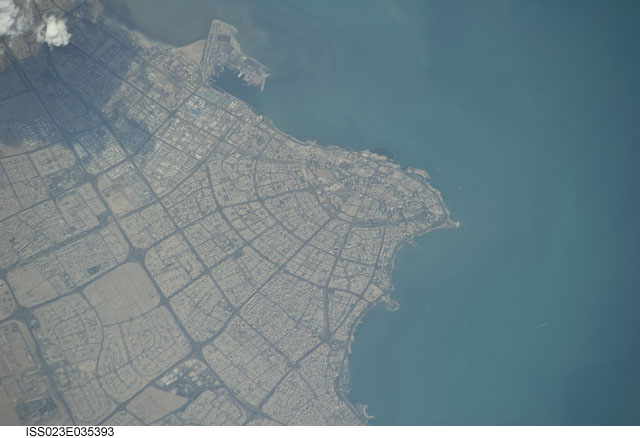
Aerial view of Kuwait City

Kuwait City has a hot desert climate (Köppen: BWh) with extremely hot, very prolonged summers and mild, short winters. It is one of the hottest cities in summer on Earth. Average summer high temperatures are above 45 °C (113 °F) for three months of the year, and during heat waves; the daytime temperature regularly exceeds 50 °C (122 °F) with nighttime lows often remaining above 30 °C (86 °F). In winter, nighttime temperatures frequently drop below 8 °C (46 °F). Considering its coastal position and relative distance to the equator in comparison with the hot desert climates in Africa and Saudi Arabia, the heat in the city is rather extreme—being surrounded in almost every direction by the hot desert.

Sand storms occur at times during summer from the shamal wind. Sand storms can occur any time of year but occur mostly during summer, and less frequently during autumn.

Climate data for Kuwait City (1991–2020, extremes 1956–present)
Month	Jan	Feb	Mar	Apr	May	Jun	Jul	Aug	Sep	Oct	Nov	Dec	Year
Record high °C (°F)	30.6 (87.1)	35.8 (96.4)	44.0 (111.2)	44.3 (111.7)	49.0 (120.2)	51.5 (124.7)	53.9 (129.0)	51.5 (124.7)	49.0 (120.2)	45.2 (113.4)	39.6 (103.3)	30.6 (87.1)	53.9 (129.0)
Mean daily maximum °C (°F)	19.6 (67.3)	22.1 (71.8)	26.5 (79.7)	32.7 (90.9)	39.9 (103.8)	45.1 (113.2)	46.6 (115.9)	46.4 (115.5)	43.0 (109.4)	36.1 (97.0)	27.1 (80.8)	21.6 (70.9)	33.6 (92.5)
Daily mean °C (°F)	13.5 (56.3)	15.3 (59.5)	19.8 (67.6)	25.9 (78.6)	32.6 (90.7)	37.2 (99.0)	38.7 (101.7)	38.2 (100.8)	34.7 (94.5)	28.4 (83.1)	20.8 (69.4)	15.3 (59.5)	27.2 (81.0)
Mean daily minimum °C (°F)	7.6 (45.7)	9.1 (48.4)	13.3 (55.9)	19.1 (66.4)	24.9 (76.8)	28.7 (83.7)	30.4 (86.7)	29.7 (85.5)	26.1 (79.0)	20.7 (69.3)	14.2 (57.6)	9.2 (48.6)	19.5 (67.1)
Record low °C (°F)	−4.0 (24.8)	−3.3 (26.1)	−0.1 (31.8)	6.9 (44.4)	14.4 (57.9)	17.3 (63.1)	21.1 (70.0)	20.6 (69.1)	16.0 (60.8)	9.4 (48.9)	0.7 (33.3)	−1.5 (29.3)	−4.0 (24.8)
Average rainfall mm (inches)	30.2 (1.19)	10.5 (0.41)	18.2 (0.72)	11.5 (0.45)	0.4 (0.02)	0.0 (0.0)	0.0 (0.0)	0.0 (0.0)	0.0 (0.0)	1.4 (0.06)	18.5 (0.73)	25.5 (1.00)	116.2 (4.57)
Average rainy days (≥ 0.1 mm)	5	3	3	1	0	0	0	0	0	1	3	3	19
Average relative humidity (%)	65	57	49	37	25	16	16	20	25	38	51	64	39
Mean monthly sunshine hours	198.1	222.5	217.6	229.3	272.5	304.5	307.1	301.6	285.1	252.2	216.5	193.5	3,000.5
Mean daily sunshine hours	7.1	7.7	7.5	7.9	9.4	10.5	10.6	10.8	10.2	9.0	7.7	6.9	8.8
Percentage possible sunshine	68	69	63	62	69	77	76	78	77	79	72	67	72
Source 1: Météo Climat, Deutscher Wetterdienst (humidity 1973-1993)
Source 2: World Meteorological Organization (rainfall 1994–2008), NOAA (sunshine 1961–1990),

== Economy ==
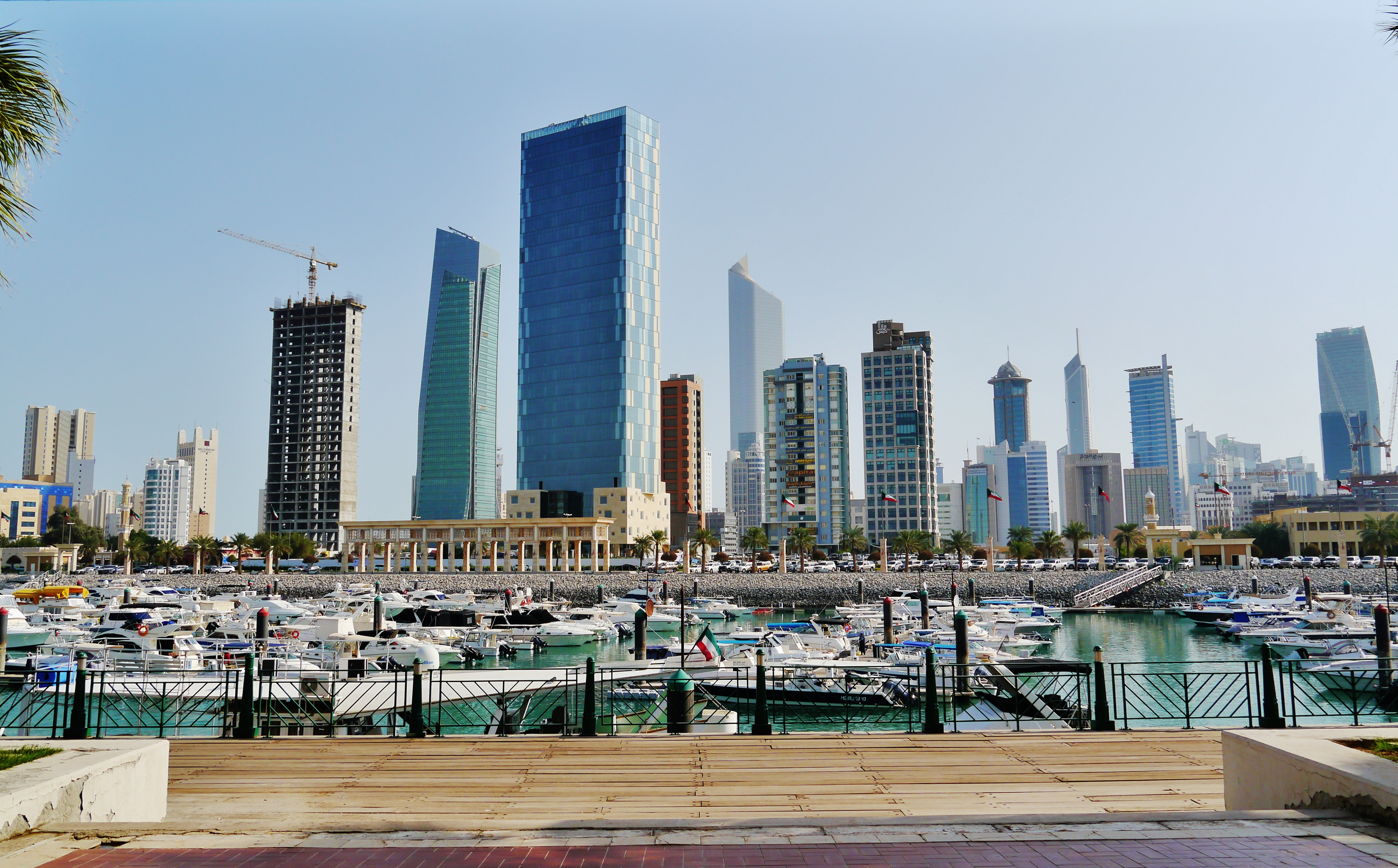
Souq Sharq Marina

Kuwait has a petroleum-based economy, petroleum and fertilisers are the main export products. As of June 15, 2024 and according to Wise, the Kuwaiti dinar is the highest-valued currency unit in the world. Petroleum accounts for 43% of GDP and 70% of export earnings.

=== Transport ===
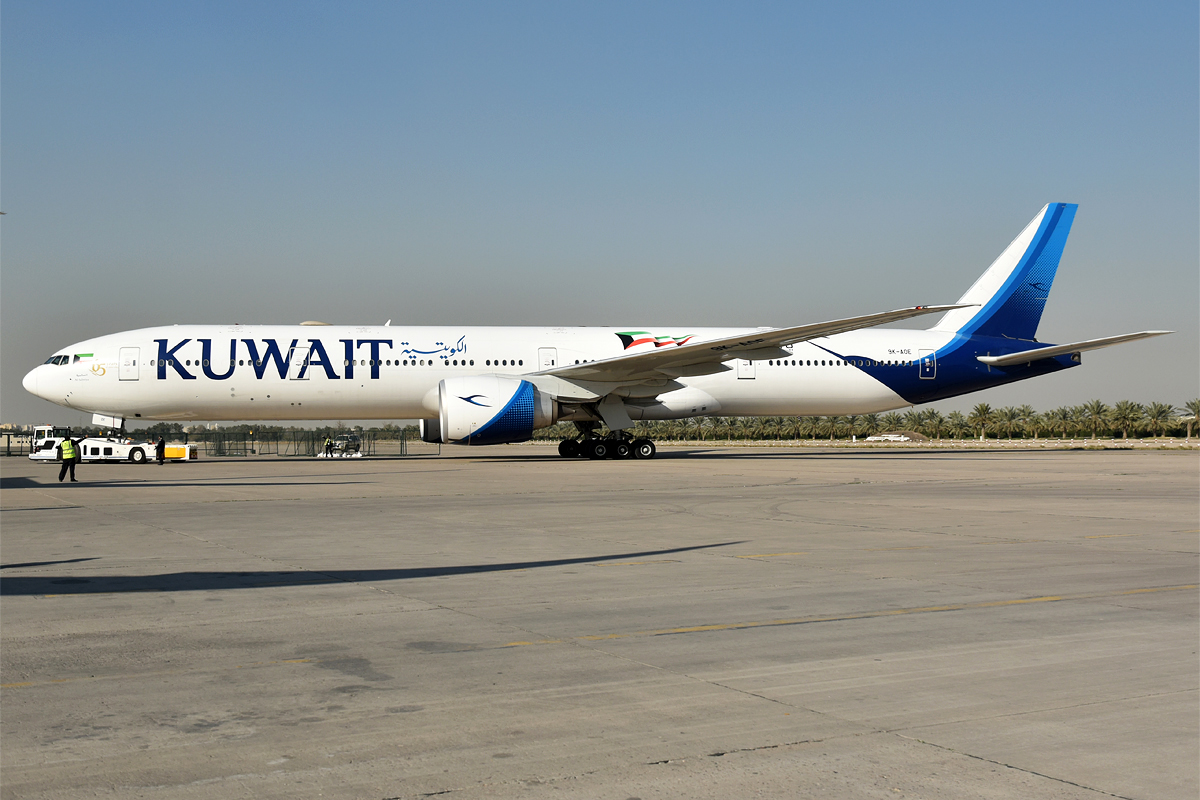
Kuwait Airways Boeing 777-300ER at Kuwait International Airport

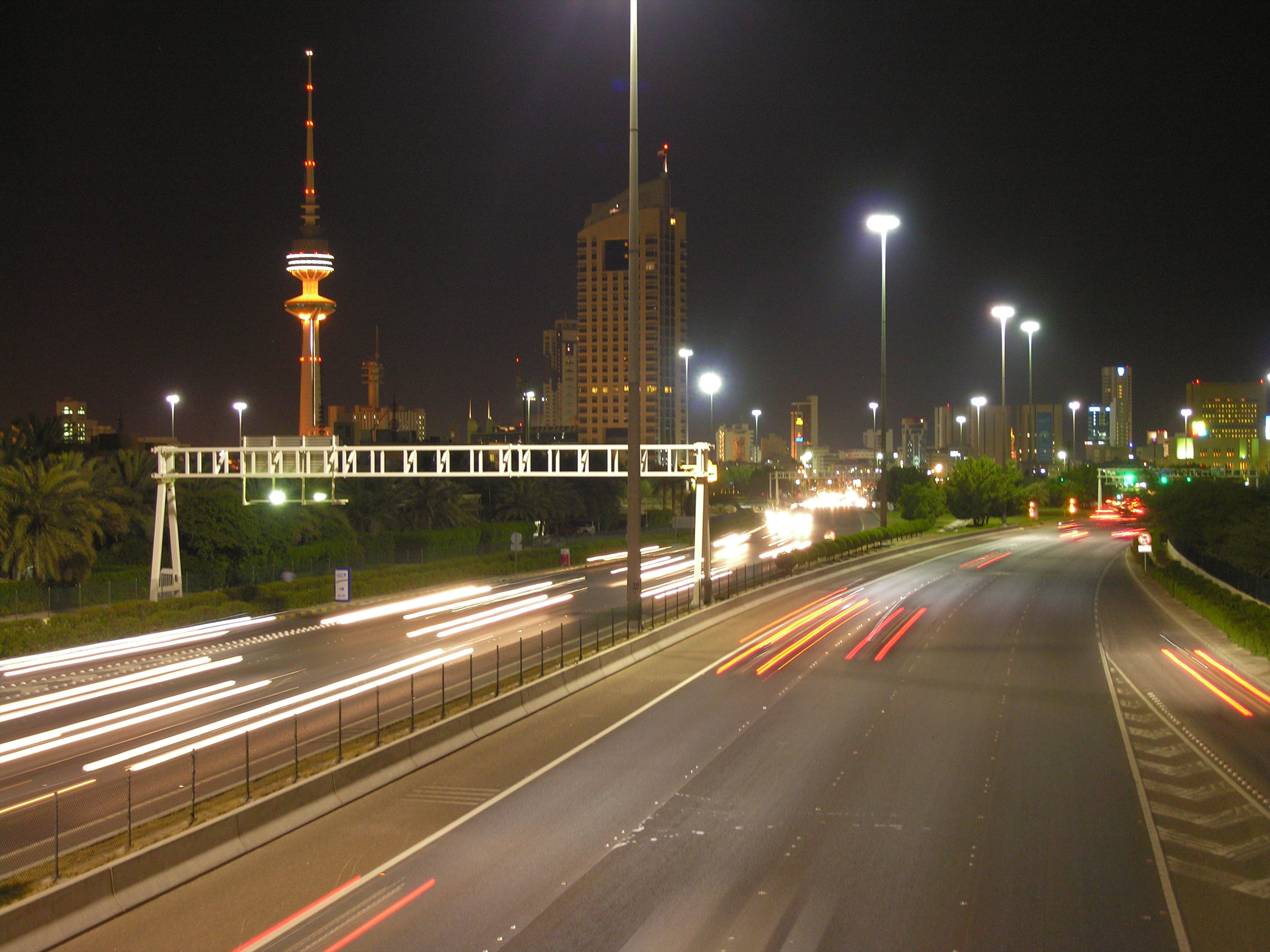
A highway in Kuwait City

There are two airports in Kuwait. Kuwait International Airport serves as the principal hub for international air travel. State-owned Kuwait Airways is the largest airline in the country. A portion of the airport complex is designated as Al Mubarak Air Base, which contains the headquarters of the Kuwait Air Force, as well as the Kuwait Air Force Museum. In 2004, the first private airline of Kuwait, Jazeera Airways, was launched. In 2005, the second private airline, Wataniya Airways was founded.

== Culture ==
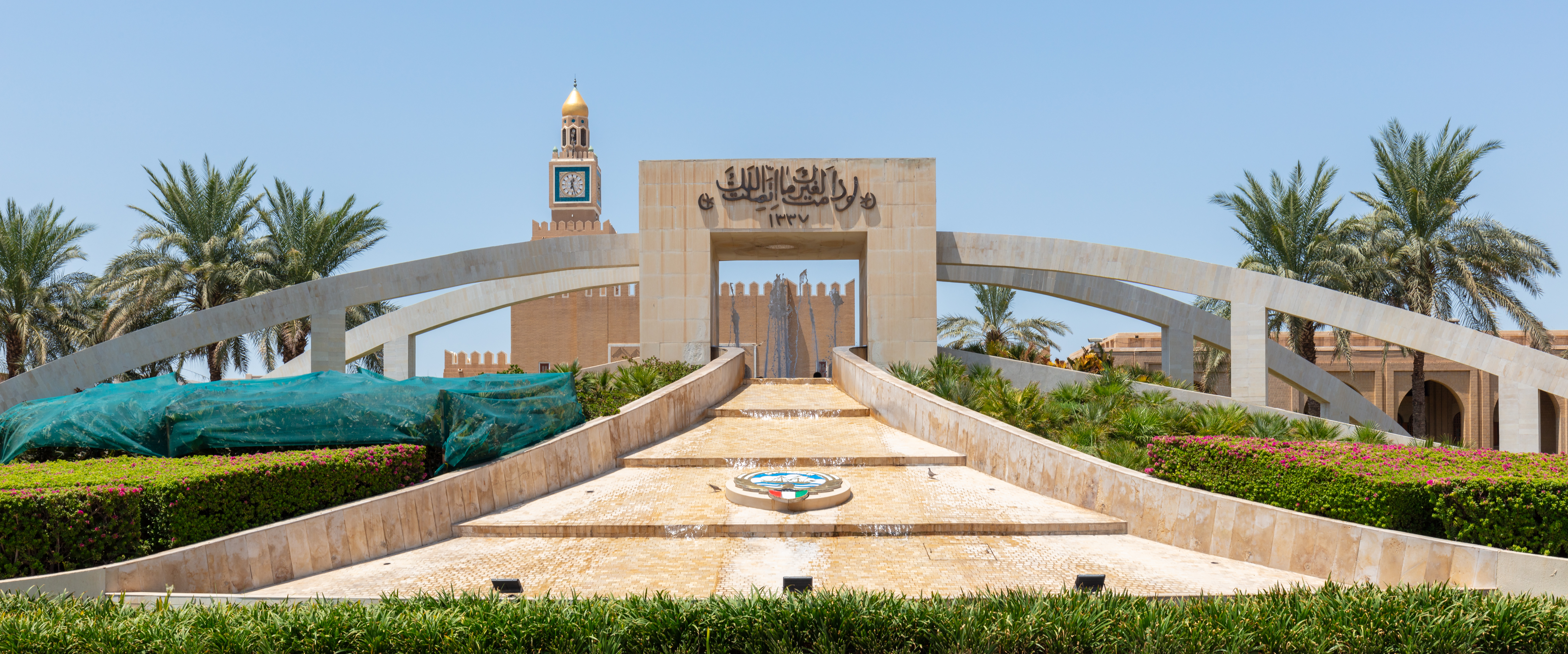
Plaza Sief

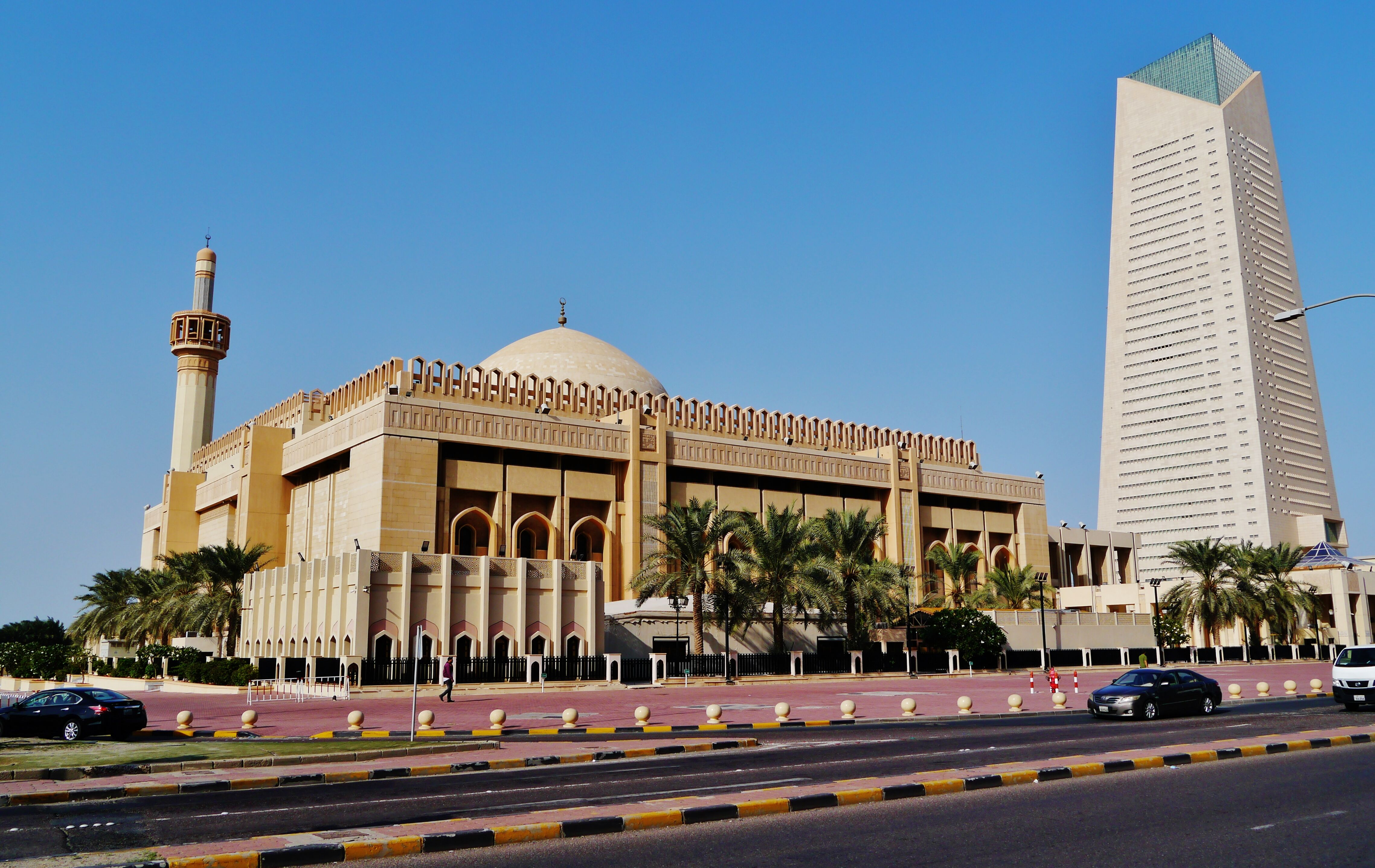
Grand Mosque of Kuwait

=== Museums and cultural centres ===
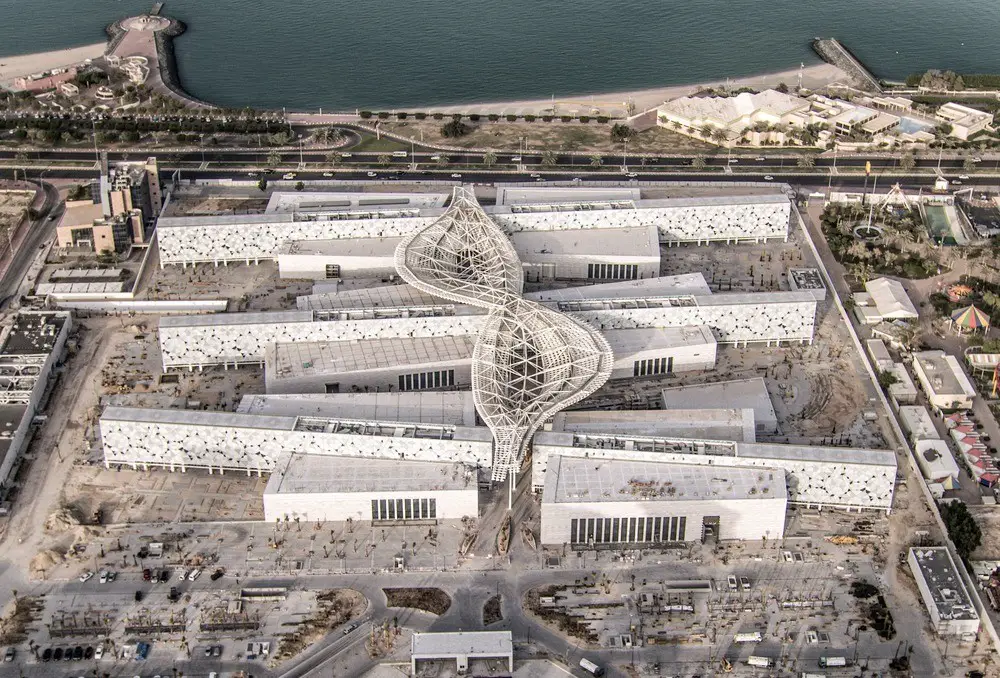
Sheikh Abdullah Al-Salem Cultural Centre

Kuwait National Museum, Museum of Modern Art, Maritime Museum, Al Shaheed Park Museums, the Al Sabah Collection, Sadu House, Al Salam Palace, and the Sheikh Jaber Al-Ahmad Cultural Centre are considered the most famous museums and cultural centres in Kuwait City.

=== Theatre ===
Kuwait is known for its home-grown tradition of theatre. Kuwait is the only Arab country in the Gulf region with a theatrical tradition. The Arabic theatrical movement in Kuwait constitutes a major part of the country's Arabic cultural life. Theatrical activities in Kuwait began in the 1920s when the first spoken dramas were released. Theatre activities are still popular today.

=== Soap operas ===
Kuwaiti soap operas (المسلسلات الكويتية) are among the most-watched soap operas in the Arab world. Most Gulf soap operas are based in Kuwait. Although usually performed in the Kuwaiti dialect, they are aired in the majority of Arabic-speaking countries and are highly popular.

=== Sports ===
Jaber Al-Ahmad International Stadium

The city is home to the Al Kuwait SC, which has traditionally provided Kuwait's national basketball team with key players.

From 13 to 15 February 2020 it held the first Aquabike World Championship Grand Prix of Kuwait.

== Notable people ==
- Abdulhussain Abdulredha (1939–2017), Kuwaiti actor
- Rania Al-Abdullah (born 1970 as Rania Al-Yassin), Kuwaiti-born queen consort of Jordan
- Saqer Al-Maosherji (born 2008), Kuwaiti racing driver
- Yasser Al-Masri (1970–2018), Kuwaiti-born Jordanian actor
- Mishary Rashid Alafasy (born 1976), qāriʾ, imam, preacher and nasheed singer
- Adline Castelino (born 1998), model, represented India in the Miss Universe 2020 pageant
- Diana Karazon (born 1983), Kuwaiti-born Jordanian singer
- Saleem Haddad (born 1983), Kuwaiti author and aid worker
- Omar Jarun (born 1983), former footballer and currently an assistant coach for Atlanta United 2
- Abdulfattah Owainat (born 1972), Kuwaiti-born Palestinian singer and songwriter

== See also ==
- List of twin towns and sister cities of Kuwait
