= Mansour Al-Mansour =

Kuwaiti actor (1941–2011)

Mansour Al-Mansour منصور المنصور
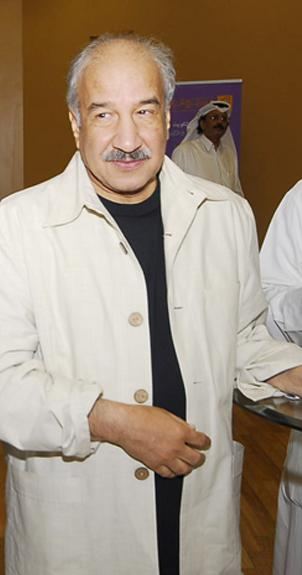
- Born: 1941; Al Mirqab, Kuwait
- Died: November 9, 2011 (aged 70); Algeria
- Occupation: Actor
- Years active: 1959–2011

Mansour Al-Mansour (Arabic:منصور المنصور) (1941 – November 9, 2011), was a Kuwaiti actor.

== Works ==
=== Series TV ===
- Hababah (1976)
- To My Father and Mother With The Greeting (1979)
- To My Father and Mother With The Greeting 2 (1982)
- Al Aseel (2007)

== Death ==
Al-Mansour was on business with the Gulf Arab Theater Group when he died of pneumonia in Algeria on November 9, 2011, after a severe cold wave.
