= Code of Personal Status (Kuwait) =

Legal code

The Code of Personal Status is a Kuwait legal code promulgated in 1984. It is similar to the Code of Personal Status in Tunisia.
