= Public holidays in Kuwait =

This is a list of holidays in Kuwait. Some dates given are according to the solar Gregorian calendar widely used internationally and some dates are according to the lunar Islamic calendar.

Public holidays in Kuwait
Day	Holiday
1 January	New Year's Day
25 February	National Day
26 February	Liberation Day
1 Muharram	Islamic New Year
12 Rabi' al-Awwal	The Prophet's Birthday
27 Rajab	The Prophet's Ascension
1 to 3 Shawwal	Eid al-Fitr
9 Dhul-Hujja	Arafat Day
10 to 13 Dhul-Hujja	Eid al-Adha
