= Odeh =

Odeh (Arabic: عودة, romanized: ʿAwda, Palestinian Arabic: ʿŌde, lit. 'Return') is a Palestinian surname, occasionally used as a masculine given name. Notable people with the name include:

== Given name ==
- Odeh Bisharat (born 1958), Arab Israeli journalist
- Odeh Al-Fakhouri (born 2005), Jordanian footballer
- Rifat Odeh Kassis, Palestinian human rights activist
- Mohammed Odeh al-Rehaief (born 1970), Iraqi attorney

== Surname ==
- Abeer Odeh (born 1962), Palestinian politician
- Aisha Odeh (born 1944), Palestinian writer and former militant
- Alex Odeh (1944–1985), Palestinian-American anti-discrimination activist and murder victim
- Ayman Odeh (born 1975), Israeli Arab lawyer and politician
- Chris Odeh, Nigerian film producer
- Fakhri Odeh (1941–2025), Kuwaiti actor
- Faris Odeh (1985–2000), Palestinian boy killed by the IDF
- Kulthum Odeh (1892–1965), Palestinian writer, translator and researcher
- Lama Abu-Odeh (born 1962), Palestinian-American professor and author
- Mohammed Odeh (born 1965), Palestinian al-Qaeda member and convicted criminal
- Mohammed Odeh (Palestinian militant) (1974–2026), Palestinian Hamas leader
- Nour Odeh, Palestinian political analyst, activist, researcher, public diplomacy consultant and journalist
- Rasmea Odeh (born 1947/48), Palestinian-American convicted criminal
- Said Odeh (2004/05–2021), Palestinian boy killed by the IDF
- Sheik Odeh (born 1950), Palestinian founder of the Islamic Jihad Movement

== See also ==
- 34786 Odeh, a main-belt asteroid
- Awda (disambiguation)
- Ouda (disambiguation)
- Oudeh
- Owda
- Owdeh, Iran
- Odeh Spring, Saudi Arabia
