= Ouda =

Ouda may refer to:

== People ==
=== Given name ===
- Ouda Tarabin (born 1981), Israeli Bedouin and former detainee of Egypt

=== Surname ===
- Abdullah Al-Ouda, Saudi legal scholar
- Bassem Ouda (born 1970), Egyptian politician
- Mohamed Ouda (born 1974), Egyptian football manager
- Salman al-Ouda (born 1956), Saudi Islamic scholar
- Waleed Ouda (born 1973), Palestinian novelist

== Places ==
- Ouda, Burkina Faso
- Ōuda, Nara, Japan

== Other ==
- OUDA, callsign for HDMY Dannebrog (A540)
- Ongole Urban Development Authority

== See also ==
- Awda (disambiguation)
- Aoda
- Odeh
- Owda
- Owdeh, Iran
