= Route 4370 =

Highway in the West Bank

- Eastern Ring Road כביש הטבעת המזרחי
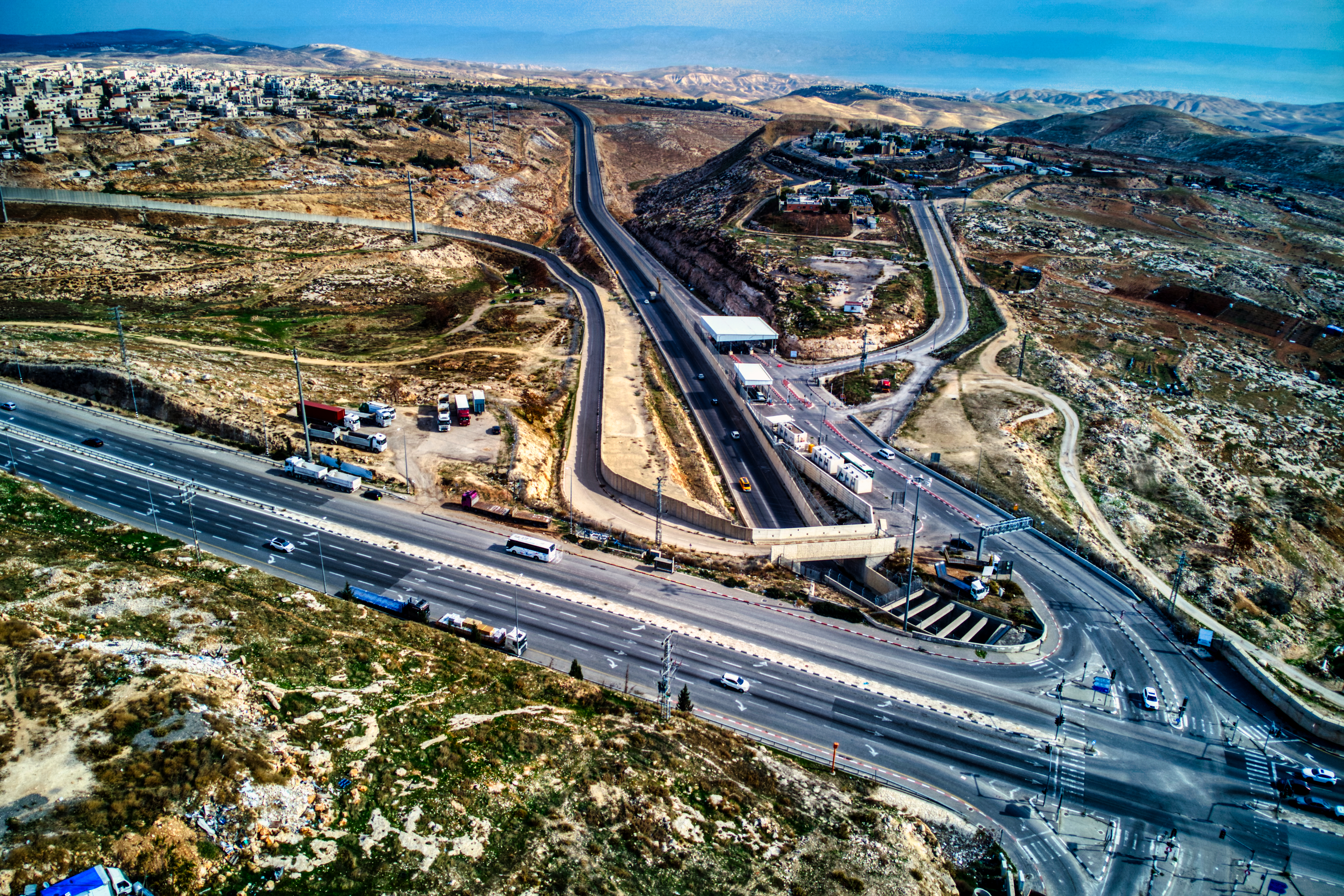
- Highway 1 - Route 4370 Junction (Al-Issawiya Junction) - one can see the barrier between the Israeli and the Palestinian lanes

Route information
- Length: 3.7 km (2.3 mi)
- Existed: 9 January 2019–present

Location
- Countries: Israel; Palestine
- Major cities: Jerusalem

Highway system
- Transport in Israel; Transport in Palestine

Route 4370 or Eastern Ring Road, is a highway that connects the Geva Binyamin settlement in the Israeli-occupied West Bank and Jerusalem. It has been referred to by its critics as an "apartheid road" due to the fact that parts of it have separate traffic for Israeli plates and Palestinian plates.

== Access control lanes ==
Separate lanes carry those who have a permit to enter Jerusalem and those who do not. The western lane is designed for people without a Jerusalem permit and does not pass through the Hizme checkpoint. The eastern lane is designed for those with a permit. Citizens of Israel can pass freely, while West Bank Palestinians require a permit from Israeli authorities. The two lanes are separated by an 8-metre-high (26 ft) concrete wall, topped with metal fencing. The road allows the residents of the Binyamins Region to enter Jerusalem with easier access to French Hill and Mount Scopus.

== History ==
Construction of the road began in 2005 and ended in 2017. Before its 9 January 2019 opening it was renovated by Moriah, the infrastructure company of the municipality of Jerusalem. The road was opened by Minister of Public Security Gilad Erdan; head of the Binyamin Regional Council Yisrael Gantz; and Jerusalem Mayor Moshe Lion. While the West Bank hosts several highways with different lanes for Israelis and Palestinians, only Route 4370 has a concrete wall spanning its length.

Erdan said the highway was "an example of the ability to create coexistence between Israelis and Palestinians while guarding (against) the existing security challenges," while the Palestinian Authority called Route 4370 an apartheid road and condemned the silence of the international community over its construction.
