= Waste Siege =

2019 book by Sophia Stamatopoulou-Robbins

Waste Siege: The Life of Infrastructure in Palestine
- Author: Sophia Stamatopoulou-Robbins
- Publisher: Stanford University Press
- Publication date: 2020
- Pages: 344
- ISBN: 978-1-5036-0730-9
- OCLC: 1084896085

Waste Siege: The Life of Infrastructure in Palestine is a nonfiction book by Sophia Stamatopoulou-Robbins. The book is an ethnography of waste management in the West Bank under the constraints of Israeli occupation, arguing that the Oslo Accords led to the abnormal presence and flow of waste for Palestinians, which Stamatopoulou-Robbins refers to as "waste siege". It is based on a decade of ethnographic fieldwork that she conducted in the West Bank for her dissertation.

Waste Siege was published by Stanford University Press in 2019, and received various recognitions including the Albert Hourani Book Award and selection as a Choice Outstanding Academic Title. Reviewers broadly praised Stamatopoulou-Robbins' ethnographic research and conclusions; some challenged specific portions of her arguments.

== Background ==
In 1995, Israel and the Palestine Liberation Organization signed the Oslo II Accord. Oslo II divided the Israeli-occupied West Bank into three areas with differing levels of control shared by the Israel and the new Palestinian National Authority. This and the other Oslo Accords were meant to be temporary but remain in effect. As a result, Palestinian civilians in the occupied Palestinian territories including the West Bank and Gaza Strip are under Israeli governance and subject to various different legal systems.

Waste Siege was written by Sophia Stamatopoulou-Robbins, then an assistant professor of anthropology at Bard College. In her second year of graduate school, Stamatopoulou-Robbins took a course titled "Power and Hegemony" taught by Partha Chatterjee. The class focused on Foucault and Gramsci; Stamatopoulou-Robbins wrote a paper about the 2006 Palestinian legislative election, in which Palestinians elected Hamas, and its connection to infrastructure in Palestine. Her interest in Palestinian infrastructure was a response to its invocation by Western leftists as the reason for the popularity of Hamas, which she found overly simplistic in light of the involvement of Israel and international aid organizations as well as the complexity and unpredictability of Palestinian relationships to infrastructure.

Stamatopoulou-Robbins' dissertation, based on 10 years of ethnographic fieldwork in the West Bank, discussed Palestinians in the West Bank and their responses to the governance of the Palestinian Authority. She specifically focused on the Authority's waste management. She later decided that she wanted to reach a broader audience, including "people who don't think much about Palestine" as well as people outside academia, and developed her dissertation into a book—her first—with added content bringing it to 344 pages' length. The book was published in 2019 by Stanford University Press.

== Synopsis ==
Waste Siege focuses on waste management in the West Bank and the ways it is shaped by the constraints of Israeli occupation. As an ethnography, it discusses the lives of Palestinians in the West Bank and the ways those lives are shaped by the presence of abnormal quantities and varieties of waste due to Israeli colonialism. Stamatopoulou-Robbins refers to these conditions as "waste siege", which she claims began in the 2000s after the Oslo Accords and displaced direct violence by Israel. She argues that waste in the West Bank is "matter with no place to go," drawing on discard studies and Latourian materialism as well as more traditional anthropology. The book also has roots in science and technology studies.

waste helps shape forms of sociality, politics, and self-understanding for people living under conditions of nonsovereignty

— Stamatopoulou-Robbins, Waste Siege, p. 5

Throughout the text, Stamatopoulou-Robbins describes Palestinian encounters with the Israeli state and the subordinate but state-like Palestinian Authority, and the ways these interactions shape the flow of waste for Palestinians alongside their individual and collective improvisations in response to the presence of waste. She conducts ethnographic work with both bureaucrats and typical governed Palestinians.

Waste Siege also includes sensory descriptions of the ways waste in the West Bank looks, smells, and feels, emphasizing the material qualities of waste.

=== "Compression" ===
The first chapter, titled "Compression", focuses on landfills in combination and contrast with other waste management methods in the West Bank. Stamatopoulou-Robbins discusses the temporal implications of landfills and their relevance to a Palestinian project of nation-building as an example of collaborative national work. She also characterizes the lives and views of the Palestinian professionals managing these landfills. These professionals know that landfills only function for a finite period of time, but are unable to access more modern waste management technology; they are educated about this technology but unable to bring it to the West Bank.

Palestinian waste professionals must also cooperate with Israel and international aid organizations to get funding for landfills. These foreign investors have the power to shape Palestinian sanitation projects even if these projects become misaligned with what Palestinians themselves believe they need.

The first chapter concludes with a specific example of the conflict that can occur between the national and international actors involved in Palestinian landfill management. The managers of Zahrat al-Finjan, a landfill run by the Palestinian Authority, are forced to choose whether to allow Israeli settlers to dump trash in the landfill or risk those settlers and others illegally dumping trash elsewhere.

=== "Inundated" ===
The second chapter, titled "Inundated", focuses on used goods smuggled from Israel into the West Bank to be sold, as well as the planned obsolescence of new goods in the West Bank market. Stamatopoulou-Robbins argues based on her fieldwork that used goods from Israel, or rabish (from rubbish), are valuable not because of sustainability or poverty but because they are of higher quality than the new goods available to Palestinians. The second chapter also describes the Palestinian pursuit of Israeli goods as linked to the Palestinian desire for sovereignty.

A theme in the discussion of rabish is the complication of travel by Israeli checkpoints, the Israeli identity card system, and vehicle registration systems of Israel and of the Palestinian Authority.

=== "Accumulation" ===
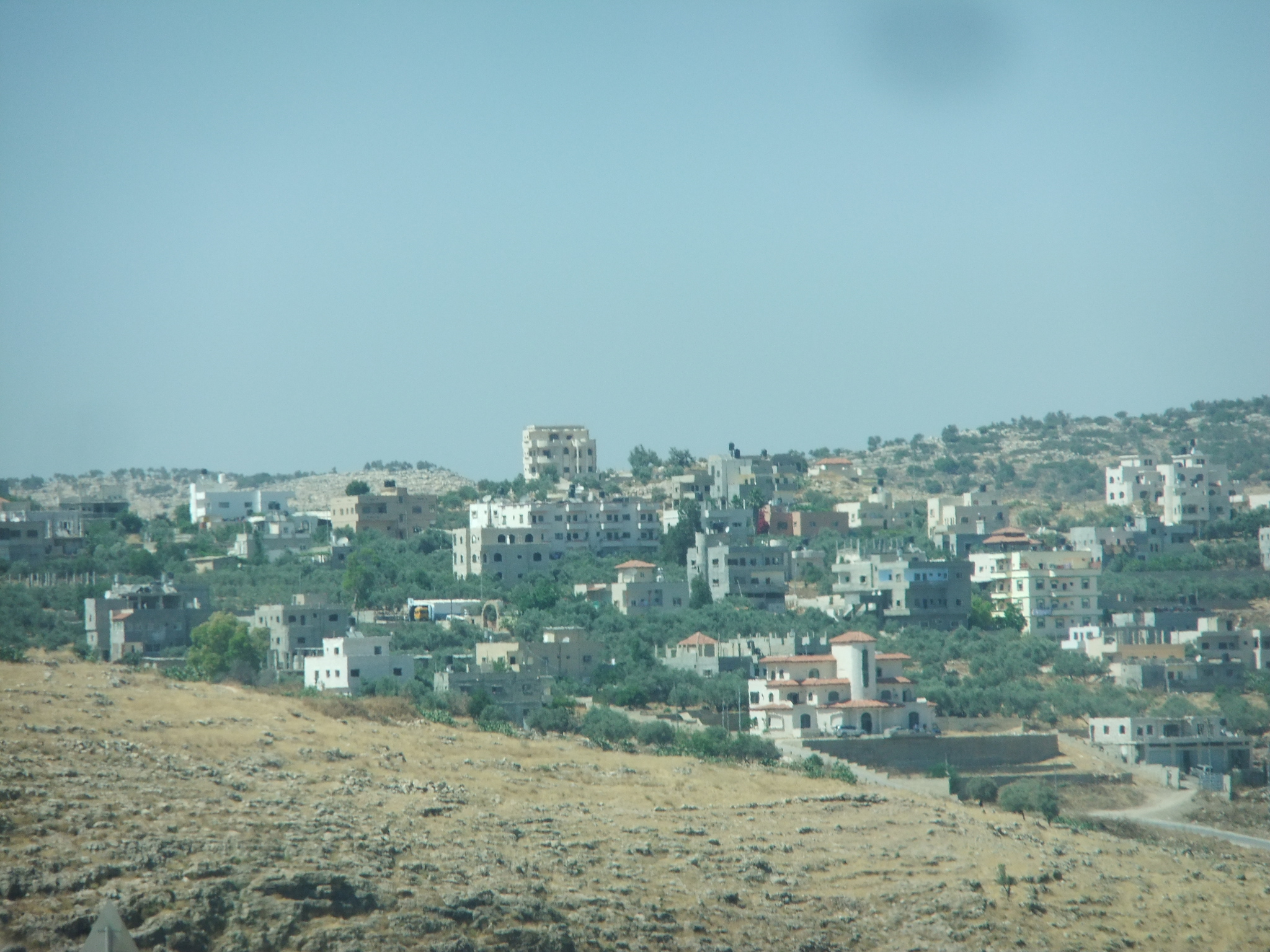
Shuqba seen from a nearby road in 2012

The third chapter, titled "Accumulation", discusses the accumulation of waste in the village Shuqba. Palestinian and Israeli waste is frequently dumped in the village, including potentially dangerous medical equipment as well as sewage and animal carcasses. Residents are gradually poisoned over time, but the variety of sources for this waste from both sides of the Green Line makes it difficult to know who to blame. In some cases villagers blamed other villagers, even when the hostile force of Israel was involved.

=== "Gifted" ===
The fourth chapter, titled "Gifted", focuses on the redistribution of stale and unwanted bread, which is hung on unrelated structures, as an example of the collective creation of infrastructure. Many Palestinians redistribute bread based on a religious prohibition on throwing it away or letting it touch the ground; Stamatopoulou-Robbins argues that bread is also sacred to Palestinians because it represents various things including interconnectedness and a desire to support one another. She also analyzes the role of shame, or ihraj, in Palestinian methods of bread redistribution; restaurant owners and bakers seek ways to get bread to people who need it without making them feel ashamed. She states that these processes of redistributing bread are "infrastructural in that they mediate urban public life, creating networks that facilitate the flow of people and ideas, allowing for their exchange over space".

=== "Leakage" ===
The fifth chapter, titled "Leakage", discusses sewage management in the West Bank. It explores the ways that the sharing of West Bank infrastructure and environment between Israeli settlers and Palestinians is complex and unequal. The concept of a "shared environment" in this space is mobilized to present Palestinians as polluters who are simultaneously incompetent and malicious, enabling Israel to justify continued "custodianship" over the West Bank.

Stamatopoulou-Robbins uses George Orwell's term doublethink to describe a phenomenon in which Palestinian waste managers attempt to manage wastewater in order to claim effective national environmental stewardship, even though they are aware that they do not have the political power to protect the shared environment of the West Bank. She argues that Israel is in fact responsible for the wastewater, but both Israel and Palestine have a political interest in asserting that Palestinian authorities are responsible for the wastewater; Israel uses Palestinian failures to maintain its image as a steward of the environment while Palestine uses waste infrastructure to assert Palestinian environmental stewardship and political power.

Stamatopoulou-Robbins also discusses the specific example of the city Nablus. Israel pipes sewage from Nablus across the Green Line and processes it in Israel, subsequently using it as a free source of water for agricultural irrigation. Israel uses this sewage flow as an example of Palestinian incompetence while repeatedly preventing the Palestinian Authority from building its own sewage infrastructure.

=== Conclusion ===
The conclusion of the book discusses the Dead Sea, with Stamatopoulou-Robbins narrating a visit to the body of water which is increasingly contaminated with sewage. It subsequently broadens in scope to discuss the implications of waste siege at a planetary scale, describing it as "a way to name the kind of living we do in the constantly changing ruins we have made".

== Reception ==
Waste Siege won the Albert Hourani Book Award from the Middle East Studies Association in 2020, and was selected as a Choice Outstanding Academic Title. In 2021 it won the Book Award of the Middle East Section of the American Anthropological Association (AAA), shared the Julian Steward Award from the Anthropology & Environment Section of the AAA, and was jointly awarded the Sharon Stephens Book Prize.

=== Reviews ===
A 2020 review in Arab Studies Quarterly found Waste Siege "an important work" and "a welcome addition to the sparse literature about the environment, waste, and infrastructure in Palestine and the Middle East more broadly". Reviewer Basma Fahoum praised Stamatopoulou-Robbins' level of knowledge about daily life for West Bank Palestinians. However, she criticized flawed translation and transliteration from Arabic to English, and argued that Palestinian redistribution of bread is not unique but a characteristic shared with many Arab and Muslim countries as well as areas of Israel populated by observant Jews.

In 2021, a positive review in PoLAR: Political and Legal Anthropology Review described the book as an effective criticism of "the putative universality of environmental threats, mobility, fixity, political violence, and state governance". In cultural geographies, reviewers analyzed Waste Siege alongside Electrical Palestine, describing the two texts as "unique in their insistence that scholars researching Palestine begin their work from the material relations that undergird everyday life". They praised Waste Siege as a well-contextualized and object-oriented work, and recommended reading the two together. A review in Arab Studies Journal found Waste Siege "an innovative and methodologically rich text" that effectively links discussion of the environment with analysis of settler colonialism. Reviewer Moné Makkawi critiqued the heavy use of jargon and unclear rhetorical choices, including the interchangeable use of the terms West Bank and Palestine with no analysis of the Gaza Strip, as well as lack of analysis of "the ways in which the violence of both military occupation and waste siege function as extensions of one another".

In HAU: Journal of Ethnographic Theory, which published multiple reviews of Waste Siege in its Spring 2021 issue, Amahl Bishara praised Stamatopoulou-Robbins' ethnographic work and her "creative and caring approach to ethnography". Like Makkawi, Bishara criticized the assertion that waste siege is replacing military violence, arguing that the latter is ongoing. Rosalind Fredericks described Waste Siege as "impressive" and "beautifully written", and emphasized its importance for the field of discard studies; she critiqued the end of the book for globalizing the concept of waste siege, arguing that this "can dilute the more powerful message that is specific to this conjuncture, in this place". Kali Rubaii linked concepts from the book to military creep and noted its "textured" implications, including "that assigning responsibility or causality for events that appear to belong to civilian life is not a straightforward act" in an environment like Palestine. Munira Khayyat described Waste Siege as "a startling new angle" on life in Palestine beyond the spectacle of war, but pushed back on Stamatopoulou-Robbins' assertion that Palestinians do not think of their improvisation and survival as resistance. Stamatopoulou-Robbins responded to this collection of reviews, explaining that she globalized her argument to counteract the way "Palestine tends not to be considered useful for thinking about much of the rest of the planet", and noting that her assertion that waste siege replaced direct Israeli violence was based on the views of Palestinians in the West Bank as expressed during her fieldwork.

In 2022, a positive review in Anthropological Quarterly found that "Waste Siege sheds light on how people negotiate being overdetermined by their colonial conditions, including through their deployment and rejection of the term (and the terms of their) environment". Also in 2022, a review in the Journal of the Royal Anthropological Institute favorably discussed Waste Siege alongside A Mass Conspiracy to Feed People and Pollution Is Colonialism; the reviewer found the book an "excellent ethnography" and a useful addition to its field.
