= Awda =

Awda or al-Awda may refer to:

== Related to Palestine ==
- Al-Awda, or the Palestinian right of return
- Al-Awda Hospital, in Gaza
- Al-Awda school, subject of the 2024 Al-Awda school attack
- Madinat al-Awda, a village in Gaza
- Sol Phryne, later Al Awda, a ship purchased by the Palestine Liberation Organization

== People ==
=== Given name ===
- Awdah Hathaleen (1994–2025), Palestinian activist and murder victim
- Awdah Ahmad Awdah Salem (died 2014), Yemeni serial killer

=== Surname ===
- Abdul Aziz Awda (born 1950), one of the founders of Palestinian Islamic Jihad
- Abdullah Awda, or Abu Zeid, a rebel leader in Syria
- Ahmad al-Awda (born 1981), Syrian military officer
- Fouzi Khalid Abdullah Al Odah or Al Awda (born 1977), Kuwaiti citizen and former Guantanamo Bay detainee
- Salman al-Ouda or al-Awda (born 1956), Saudi Arabian Islamic scholar

== Other uses ==
- Al-Awda (guerrilla organization), an Arab socialist political party in Iraq

== See also ==
- Adwa (disambiguation)
- Ouda (disambiguation)
- Awdal, a region of Somaliland
- Alouda, a sweet, cold beverage in Mauritian cuisine
