= Adwa (disambiguation) =

Adwa is a town in the Tigray Region of Ethiopia.

Adwa may also refer to:

- Adwa (woreda), district in Tigray Region, Ethiopia
- Adwa (volcano), in Somali Region, Ethiopia
- Adwa (film), a 1999 Ethiopian documentary

== See also ==
- Adua (disambiguation)
- Awda (disambiguation)
- Battle of Adwa, in the First Italo-Ethiopian War, 1896
  - Adwa Victory Day
- Hewett Treaty, or Treaty of Adwa, 1884
- Adowa dance, in Ghana
