= Yagli-El =

King

Yagli-El (Yaglī-ʼel - the god has shown himself or the god revealed) was a king from Dilmun who was ruling around 1700 BC. Yagli-El is known from four cuneiform inscriptions that were carved in steatite vessels. One of these vessels was found at the ancient Dilmun capital at Qal'at al-Bahrain. The three other vessels were found in a more that 30 m in diameter monumental stone built circular tomb at a site called the Royal Mound of A'ali in Bahrain - since 2019 a UNESCO World Heritage site. (Dilmun Burial Mounds - UNESCO World Heritage Centre). An extensive excavation campaign (2010–2022) led by Dr Steffen Terp Laursen has proven the site was the cemetery of the kings of Bronze Age Dilmun. All four inscriptions bear the same text: Palace of Yagli-El, the servant of Inzak of Akkarum. In one of the inscriptions from the tomb it is also mentioned that Yagli-El's father's name was Riʼmum. Ri'mum is known from another now lost inscription and must also have been king and Yagli-El's predecessor. The inscriptions that mentioning Yaglī-ʼel and his farther King Rimum, were discovered by Laursen in 2015 during post-excavation analysis of finds from Royal Mound 8. The tomb of Yagli-El (Mound 8) had been excavated by a Bahrain team in 2009-2011 and the finds are now displayed in the Bahrain National Museum's Hall of Graves. The evidence for the dating of Yagli-el's tomb and his royal dynasty buried at A’ali comes from an extensive program of radiocarbon dating and Bayesian modelling. The analysis shows that the royal cemetery was in use during the first three centuries of the 2nd millennium BC. The model dated the time of construction of the tomb of King Yagli-El to between 1738 and 1658 BC (±1σ/68.2%), or 1783-1627 BC (±2σ/95.4%). The excavation and the dates suggest he was one of very the last Dilmun kings entombed at the dynastic cemetery. The style of the cuneiform signs also dates king Yagli-El to around 1700 BC.

A king (lugal) of Dilmun is mentioned in cuneiform texts. The name Yagli-El is Amoritic showing Amorite presence or influence in Dilmun.

In 2025 the stone vessel inscriptions of Yagli-El were included in the prestigious UNESCO Memory of the World register.

Following the discovery of the inscribed stone vessels, new evidence about Yagli-El has come to light. An article published in April 2026 present the impressions of two different inscribed stamp seals found in Bahrain which both mentions a “ Servant of Panipa, Yagli-El (Laursen et al. 2026). The goddess Panipa is believed to have been the wife of Dilmun’s main god Inzak. That the Yagli-El from the tomb inscriptions is the “Servant of Inzak” and the Yagli-El from the seals is the “Servant of Panipa” suggest to the authors of the 2026 study that there was a close connection. They argue that the two seals date from Yagli-El's time as crown prince and that the vessels were inscribed “Palace of Yagli-El Servant of Inzak”, only after Yagli-El had become king when his father Rimum (Servant of Inzak) had died.

== Literature ==
- Laursen, S. T. and Olesen, J., 2017. Chapter 9. Radiocarbon chronology based on Bayesian modelling in Steffen Terp Laursen, inːː The Royal Mounds of A'ali in Bahrain, Aarhus 2017, ISBN 978-87-93423-16-9, pp. 371–375
- Laursen, S.T., Al Shaikh, N., Reeler, C. N., Lombard, P., G. Marchesi, 2026. Stamped Tokens with Cuneiform Inscriptions from Bahrain: New Light on Kingship and the Gods in Early 2nd Millennium BC Dilmun, inː Journal of Near Eastern Studies: 85/1, https://doi.org/10.1086/739820
