= Dilmun =

Ancient Arabian civilization

- Location of foreign lands for the Mesopotamians, including Elam, Magan, Dilmun, Marhashi and Meluhha
- Type: Ancient
- Periods: Bronze Age
- Location: Eastern Arabia
- Region: Northern Governorate
- Part of: Eastern Arabia

History
- Built: c. late 4th millennium BC
- Abandoned: c. 538 BC

Dilmun, or Telmun, (Note: The former is the reconstructed Sumerian pronunciation; the latter is the reconstructed Semitic.) (Sumerian:, later 𒉌𒌇(𒆠), NI.TUK^{ki} = dilmun^{ki}; Arabic: دلمون) was an ancient East Semitic–speaking civilization in Eastern Arabia mentioned from the 3rd millennium BC onwards, covering the transition from Prehistoric Arabia into the historic period. Based on contextual evidence, it was located in the Persian Gulf, on a trade route between Mesopotamia and the Indus Valley Civilisation, close to the sea and to artesian springs. Dilmun encompassed Bahrain, Kuwait, and eastern Saudi Arabia.

The great commercial and trading connections between Mesopotamia and Dilmun were strong and profound to the point where Dilmun was a central figure to the Sumerian creation myth. Dilmun was described in the saga of Enki and Ninhursag as pre-existing in paradisiacal state, where predators do not kill, pain and diseases are absent, people do not get old, there is no fear or terror, and no death.

Dilmun was an important trading centre. At the height of its power, it controlled the Persian Gulf trading routes. According to some modern theories, the Sumerians regarded Dilmun as a sacred place, but that is never stated in any known ancient text. Dilmun was mentioned by the Mesopotamians as a trade partner, a source of copper, and a trade entrepôt.

The Sumerian tale of the garden paradise of Dilmun may have been an inspiration for the Garden of Eden story.

== History ==
Dilmun on the relief of Ur-Nanshe

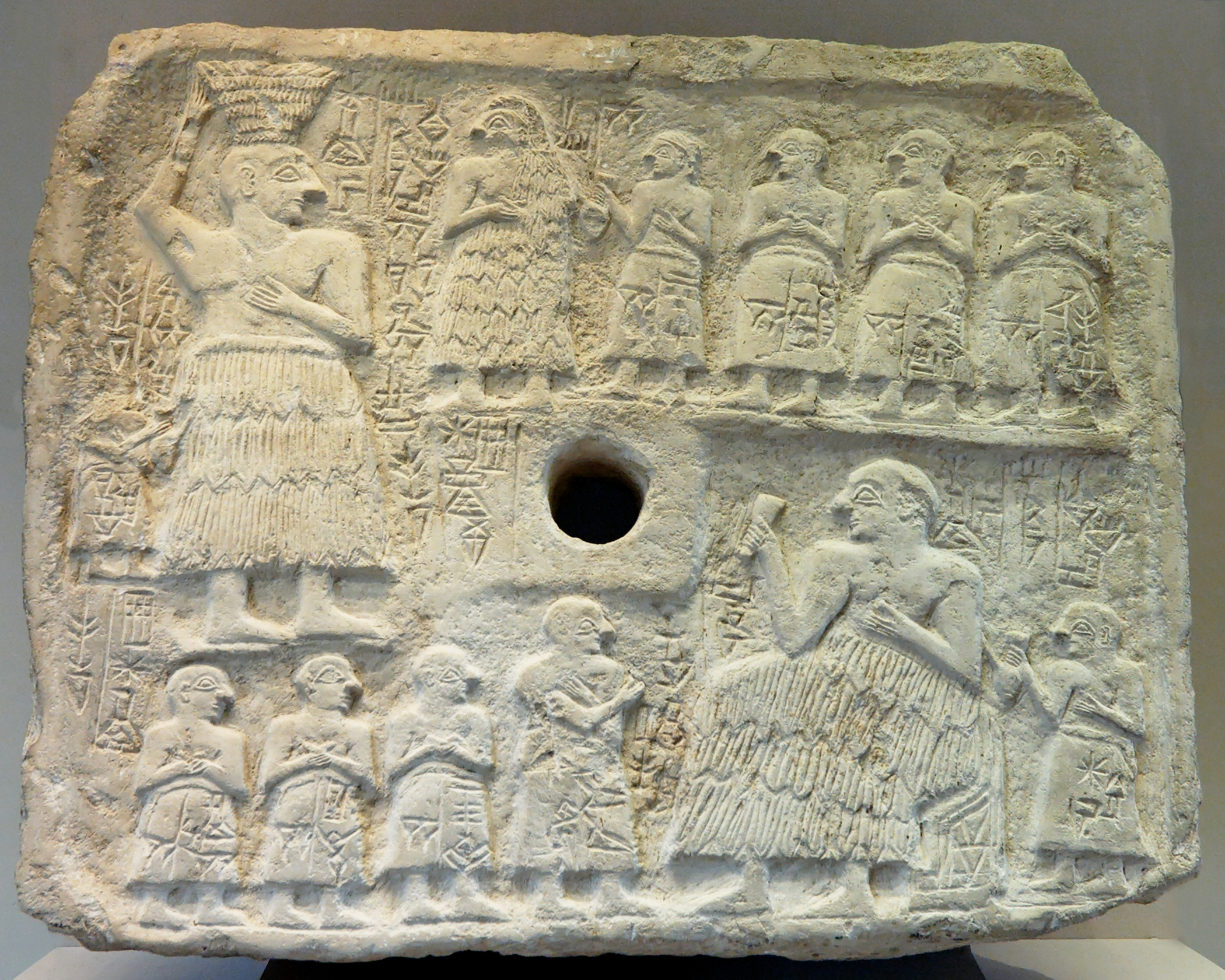
Votive relief of Ur-Nanshe, king of Lagash: one of the inscriptions reads, "boats from the (distant) land of Dilmun carried the wood (for him)", which is the oldest known written record of Dilmun and importation of goods into Mesopotamia.

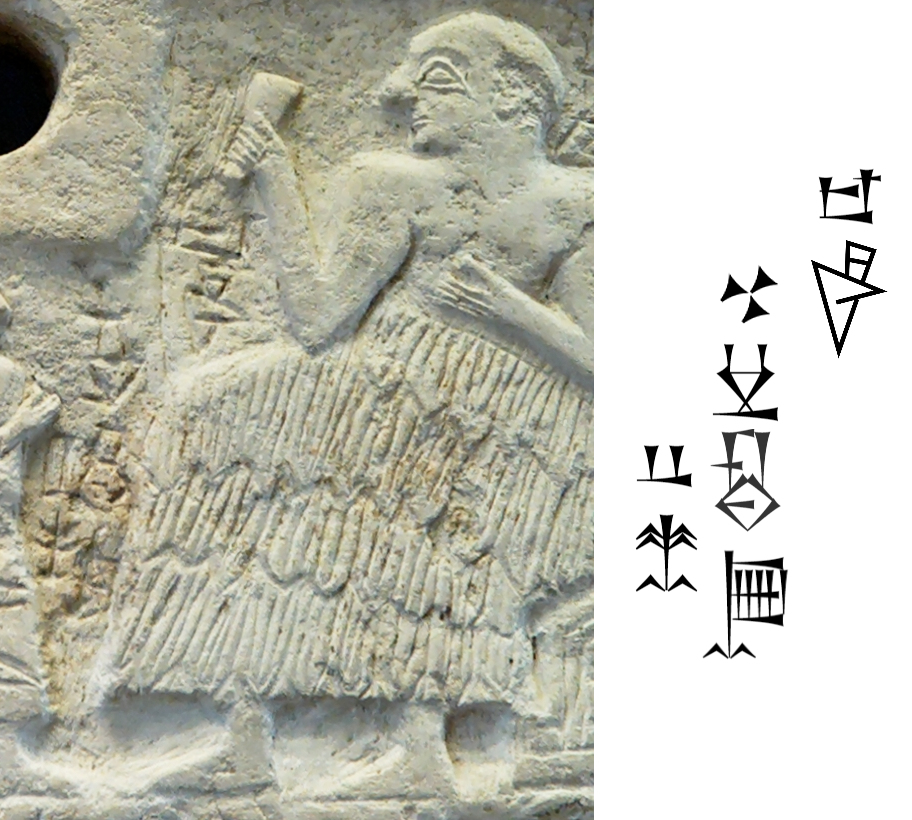
"Boats from the land of Dilmun carried the wood"
𒈣𒆳𒋫𒄘𒄑𒈬-𒅅
ma2 dilmun kur-ta gu2 gesz mu-gal2
on the relief of Ur-Nanshe. Limestone, Early Dynastic III (2550–2500 BC). Found in Telloh (ancient city of Girsu).

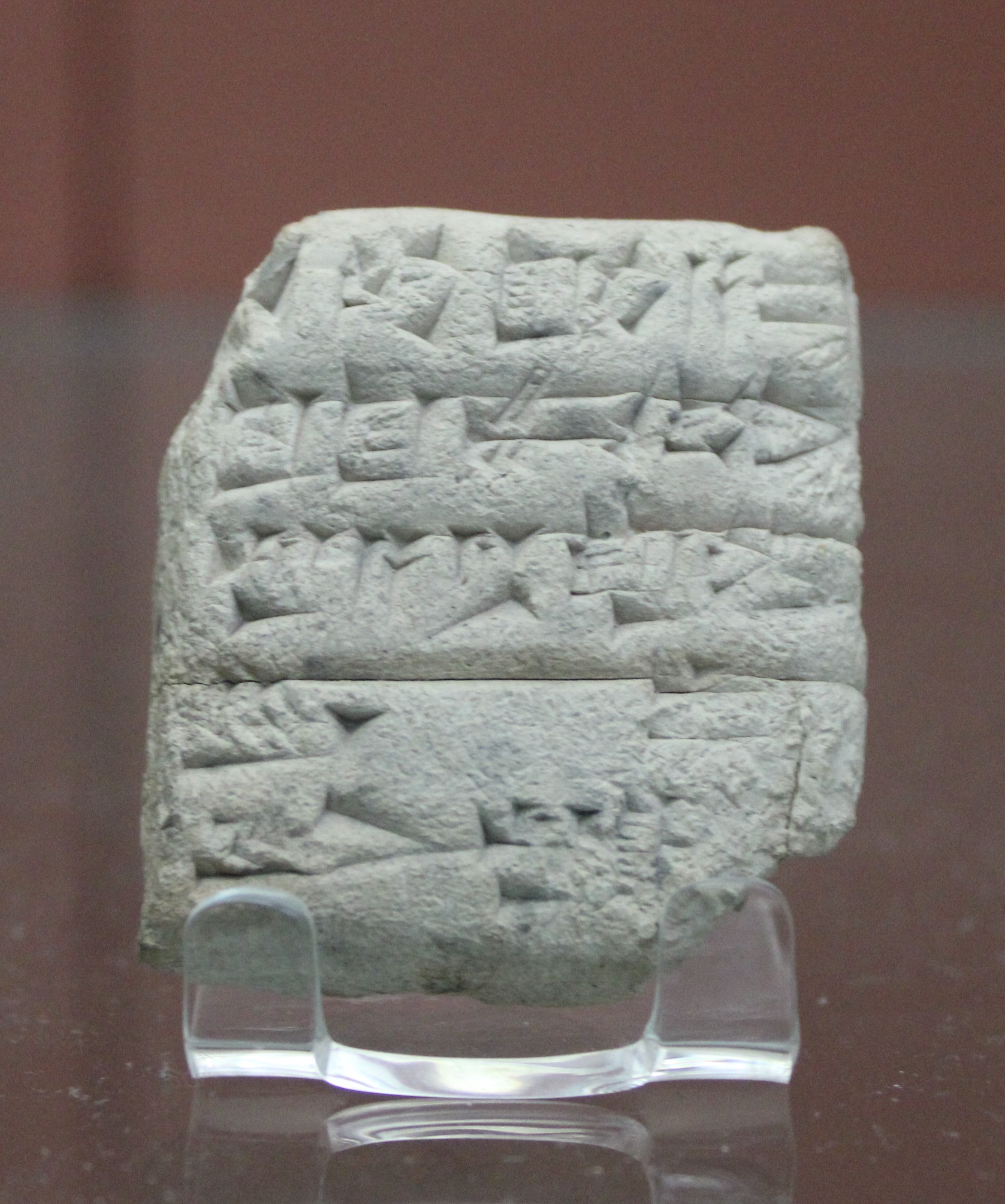
Receipt for garments sent by boat to Dilmun in the 1st year of Ibbi-Sin's rule, c. 2028 BC. British Museum BM 130462.

Dilmun was an important trading center from the late fourth millennium BC to 800 BC. At the height of its power, Dilmun controlled the Persian Gulf trading routes. It was very prosperous during the first 300 years of the second millennium BC. Conquered by the Middle Assyrian Empire (1365–1050 BC), its commercial power began to decline between 1000 BC and 800 BC because piracy flourished in the Persian Gulf. In the 8th and 7th centuries BC the Neo-Assyrian Empire (911–605 BC) conquered Dilmun, and in the 6th century BC the Neo-Babylonian Empire, and later the Achaemenid Empire, ruled.

The Dilmun civilization was the centre of commercial activities linking traditional agriculture of the land—then quite fertile due to artesian wells that have since dried, and due to a much wetter climate—with maritime trade between diverse regions such as the Indus Valley and Mesopotamia in its early stage and later between China and the Mediterranean. The Dilmun civilization is mentioned first in Sumerian cuneiform clay tablets dated to the late third millennium BC, found in the temple of the goddess Inanna, in the city of Uruk. The adjective Dilmun is used to describe a type of axe and one specific official; in addition there are lists of rations of wool issued to people connected with Dilmun.

One of the earliest inscriptions mentioning Dilmun is that of king Ur-Nanshe of Lagash (c. 2300 BC) found in a door-socket: "The ships of Dilmun brought him wood as tribute from foreign lands." Some texts mention that Ur exported wool to Dilmun, and these texts indicate that merchants returned from Dilmun to Ur with abundant profits. Other texts mention commercial agreements and contracts between Dilmun and Ur, which shows that the connection between them was close. The merchants of Ur would send ships to Dilmun loaded with crops from Mesopotamia and foreign markets such as Persia, the Levant, and Asia Minor, and sell them to Dilmun merchants who, in turn, would export them to other places in India, Africa, or to the Arabian Peninsula. Among the things they would return with from Bahrain were metals such as copper, whose prices were high in Ur, wood, perfumes, and expensive things such as pearls, which were sold at high prices in the markets of Ur, so the merchants would reap a huge profit.

=== Kingdom of Dilmun ===
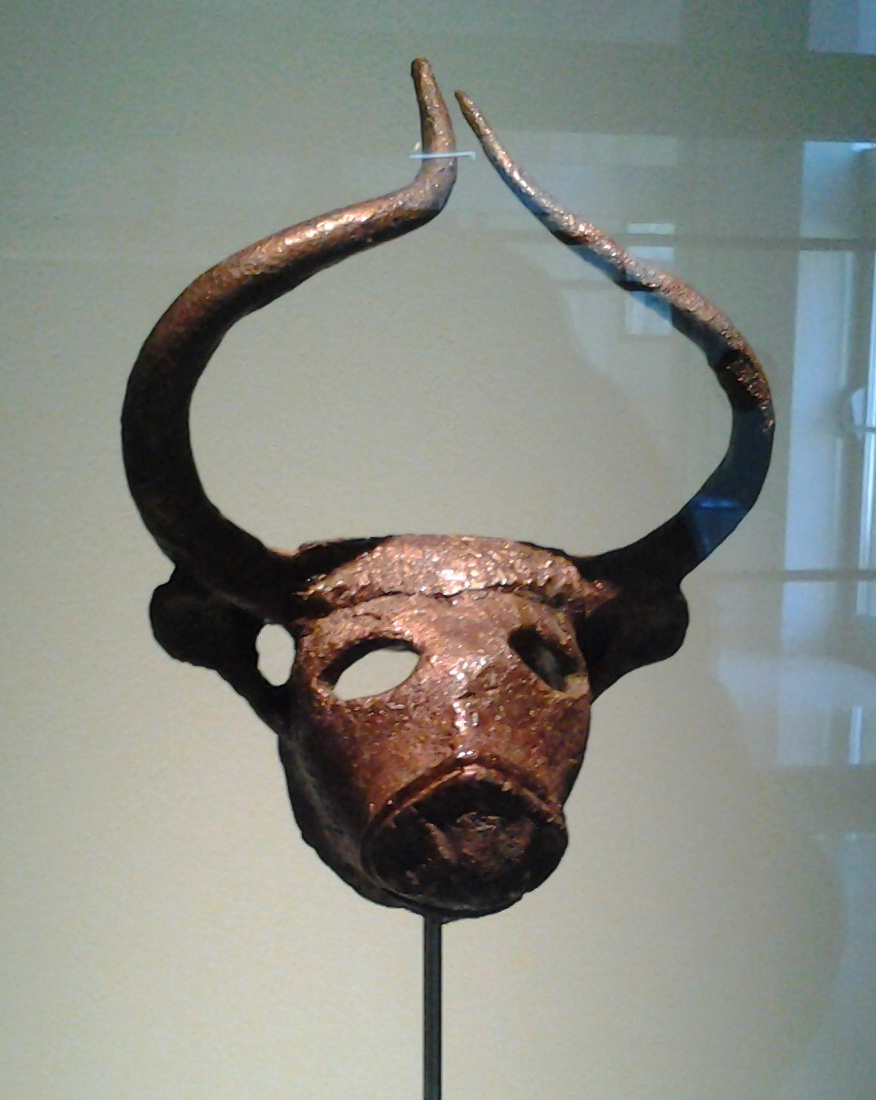
Bull's head, made of copper in the early period of Dilmun (c. 2000 BC), discovered by Danish archeologists under Barbar Temple, Bahrain

From around 2050 BC onward, Dilmun seems to have been at its peak. Qal'at al-Bahrain was most likely the capital of Dilmun. From texts found at Isin, it is believed Dilmun became an independent kingdom, free from Mesopotamian rule; royal gifts to Dilmun are mentioned. Contacts with the Amorite state of Mari, in the northern Levant, are attested. Around this time, the largest royal burial mounds were erected. From about 1780 BC came several Akkadian-language inscriptions on stone vessels naming two kings of Dilmun, King Yagli-El (an Amoritic name) and his father, Rimum. The inscriptions were found in huge tumuli, evidently the burial places of these kings. Rimum was already known to archaeology from the Durand Stone, discovered in 1879.

A decline is visible from around 1720 BC. Many settlements were no longer used, and the building of royal mounds ceased. The Barbar Temple fell into ruins. A 'recovering' period is noted from around 1650 BC. New royal burial mounds were built; at Qal'at al-Bahrain, there is evidence for increased building activity. A seal from this period found at Failaka preserved a king's name. The short text reads, [La]'ù-la Panipa, daughter of Sumu-lěl, the servant of Inzak of Akarum. Sumu-lěl was evidently another king of Dilmun (the third king whose name we know) from around this period. Servant of Inzak of Akarum was the king's title in Dilmun. The names of these later rulers are Amoritic. Another name of a king known from Failaka is Samuʽa, also attested on a stamp seal.

=== Dilmun under foreign rule ===
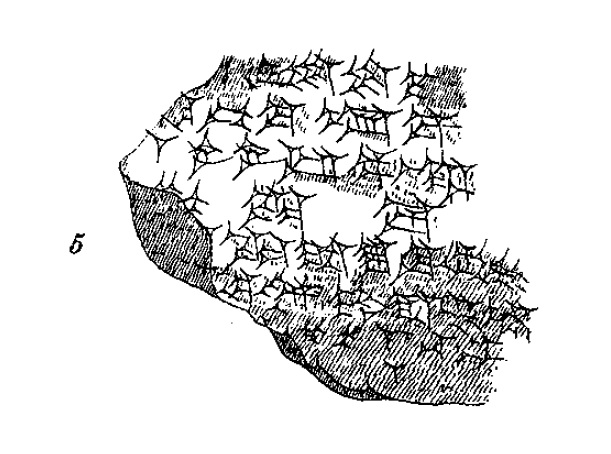
Correspondence between Ilī-ippašra, the governor of Dilmun, and Enlil-kidinni, the governor of Nippur,c. 1350 BC

From at least 1500 BC, Dilmun was likely under the rule of the Akkadian-speaking Mesopotamian Sealand dynasty. The Sealand dynasty King Ea-gamil is mentioned in a text found at Qal'at al-Bahrain. Ea-gamil was the last ruler of the Sealand dynasty. After his reign, Dilmun came under the rule of the Babylonian Kassite dynasty, as they took over the land of the Sealand dynasty. Dilmun was mentioned in two letters dated to the reign of Burna-Buriash II (c. 1370 BC), recovered from Nippur during the Kassite dynasty of Babylon. These letters were from a provincial official named Ilī-ippašra, in Dilmun, to his friend, Enlil-kidinni, the governor of Nippur. The names referred to are Akkadian. These letters, and other documents, suggest an administrative relationship between Dilmun and Babylon at that time. Following the collapse of the Kassite dynasty, in 1595 BC, Mesopotamian documents make no mention of Dilmun until Assyrian inscriptions (dated from 1250 BC to 1050 BC) proclaimed Assyrian kings to be rulers of Dilmun and Meluhha, as well as Lower Sea and Upper Sea. Assyrian inscriptions recorded tribute from Dilmun.

There are other Assyrian inscriptions during the first millennium BC, indicating Assyrian sovereignty over Dilmun. One of the early sites discovered in Bahrain suggests that Sennacherib, King of Assyria (707–681 BC), attacked northeast Arabia and captured the Bahraini islands. The most recent reference to Dilmun came during the Neo-Babylonian Empire; Neo-Babylonian administrative records, dated 567 BC, stated that Dilmun was controlled by the King of Babylon. The name of Dilmun fell from use after the collapse of Babylon, in 538 BC, with the area henceforth identified as Tylos during the Hellenistic period.

The "Persian Gulf" types of circular, stamped (rather than rolled) seals known from Dilmun—that appear at Lothal, Gujarat, India, and Failaka (as well as in Mesopotamia)—are evidence of long-distance sea trade. What the commerce consisted of is less known; timber and precious woods, ivory, lapis lazuli, gold, and luxury goods (such as carnelian and glazed stone beads), pearls from the Persian Gulf, shell and bone inlays were among the goods sent to Mesopotamia, in-exchange for silver, tin, woolen textiles, olive oil and grains.

Copper ingots from Oman and bitumen (which occurred naturally in Mesopotamia) may have been exchanged for cotton textiles and domestic fowl, major products of the Indus region that are not native to Mesopotamia. Instances of all of these trade goods have been found. The importance of this trade is shown by the fact that the weights and measures used at Dilmun were identical to those used by the Indus, and were not those used in Southern Mesopotamia.

In regards to copper mining and smelting, the Umm al-Nar culture and Dalma culture (United Arab Emirates) and Ibri (Oman) were particularly important.

Some Meluhhan vessels may have sailed directly to Mesopotamian ports but, by the Isin-Larsa Period, Dilmun monopolized the trade. The Bahrain National Museum assesses that its "Golden Age" lasted c. 2200–1600 BC. Discoveries of ruins under the Persian Gulf may be of Dilmun.

== People and language ==
Dilmunite
- Native to: Dilmun
- Region: Bahrain, Kuwait and eastern Saudi Arabia
- Era: First half of the second millennium BC
- Language family: Afro-Asiatic: Semitic; East Semitic?; Dilmunite
- Writing system: Cuneiform

Language codes
- ISO 639-3: None (mis)
- Glottolog: None

The population used cuneiform to write in the Akkadian language, and, like the Akkadians, Assyrians, Babylonians and Eblaites of Mesopotamia, are thought to have spoken an East Semitic language that was either an Akkadian dialect or one close to it, rather than a Central Semitic language, and most of its known rulers had East Semitic names. Dilmun's main deity was named Inzak and his spouse was Panipa. However, there is no indication of population replacement having happened in the region.

== Mythology ==
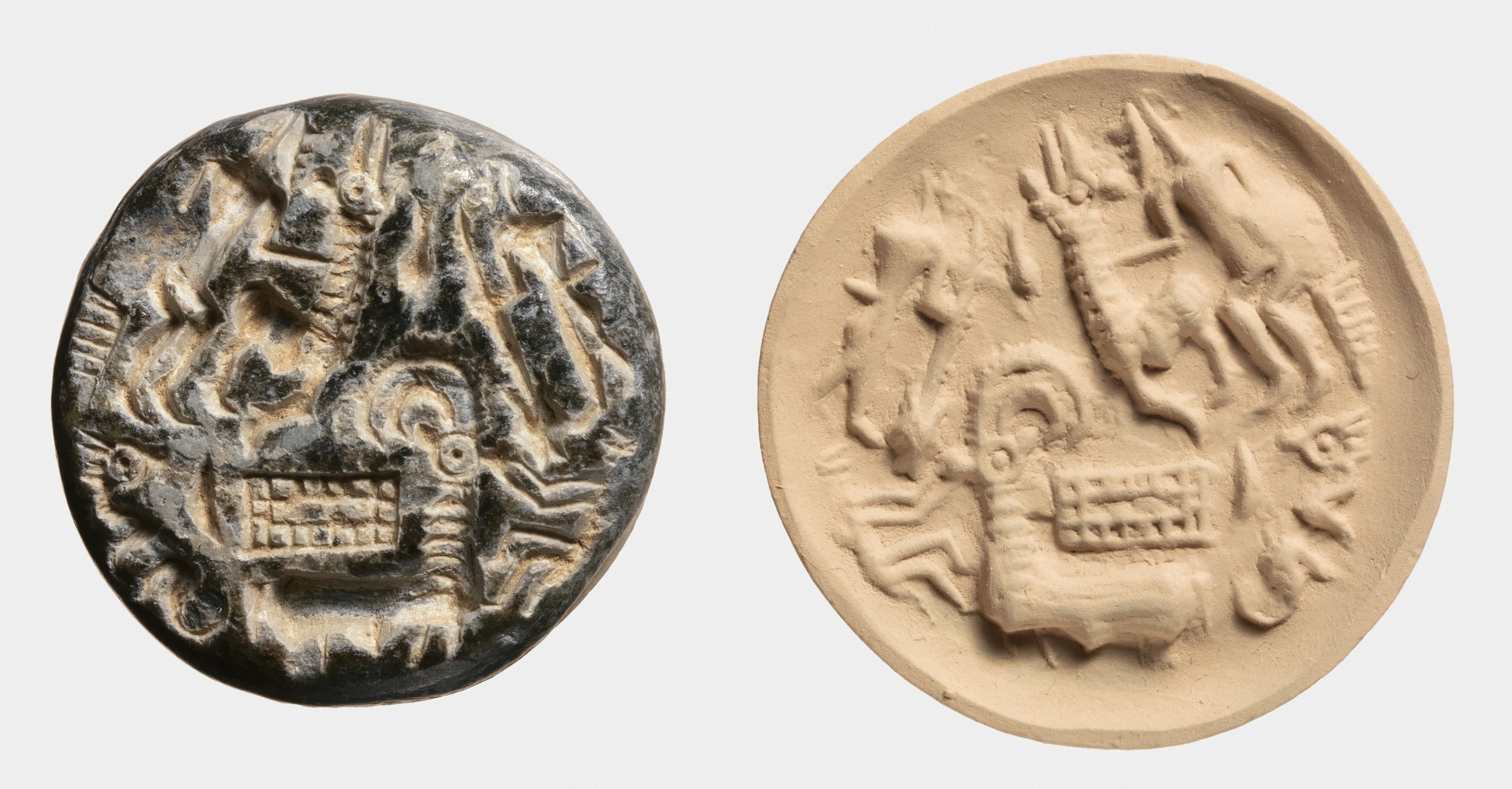
Dilmun stamp seal with hunters and goats, rectangular pen, c. early 2nd millennium BC

In the early epic Enmerkar and the Lord of Aratta, the main events, which center on Enmerkar's construction of the ziggurats in Uruk and Eridu, are described as taking place at a time "before Dilmun had yet been settled".

Dilmun, sometimes described as "the place where the sun rises" and "the Land of the Living", is the scene of some versions of the Eridu Genesis, and the place where the deified Sumerian hero of the flood, Utnapishtim (Ziusudra), was taken by the gods to live forever. Thorkild Jacobsen's translation of the Eridu Genesis calls it "Mount Dilmun", which he locates as a "faraway, half-mythical place".

Dilmun is also described in the epic story of Enki and Ninhursag as the site at which the Creation occurred. The later Babylonian Enuma Elish speaks of the creation site as the place where the mixture of salt water, personified as Tiamat, met and mingled with the fresh water of Abzu. 'Bahrain' in Arabic means "the twin waters", where the fresh water of the Arabian aquifer mingles with the salt waters of the Persian Gulf. The promise of Enki to Ninhursag, the Earth Mother:

For Dilmun, the land of my lady's heart, I will create long waterways, rivers and canals, whereby water will flow to quench the thirst of all beings and bring abundance to all that lives.

Ninlil, the Sumerian goddess of air and south wind, had her home in Dilmun.

However, it is also speculated that Gilgamesh had to pass through Mount Mashu to reach Dilmun in the Epic of Gilgamesh, which is usually identified with the whole of the parallel Lebanon and Anti-Lebanon mountain ranges, with the narrow gap between these mountains constituting the tunnel.

Samuel Noah Kramer noted similarities with the Sumerian myth and biblical paradise motifs. Dilmun as a place where "the lion does not slay, the wolf was not carrying off lambs", has been paralleled with Isaiah 11, where "the wolf shall dwell with the lamb, the leopard shall lie down with the kid, an ox and a young lion will graze together".

== Location ==
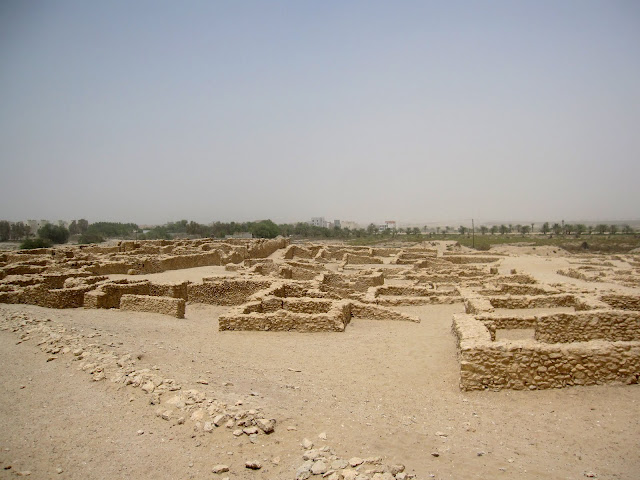
Ruins of a settlement, believed to be from the Dilmun civilization, in Sar, Bahrain

Location of burial mounds in Bahrain

The Barbar Temple were the first parts of Dilmun society to be re-discovered from 1954 by Geoffrey Bibby and Peter Glob, and the summit of a gravel mound was removed in the winter of 1955 and walls were excavated in February and March 1956, extending to 1962.

In 1987, archaeologist Theresa Howard-Carter proposed that Dilmun of this era might be a still unidentified tell near the Arvand Rud (Shatt al-Arab in Arabic) between modern-day Qurnah and Basra in modern-day Iraq. In favor of Howard-Carter's proposal, it has been noted that this area does lie to the east of Sumer ("where the sun rises"), and the riverbank where Dilmun's maidens would have been accosted aligns with the Shatt al-Arab which is in the midst of marshes. The "mouth of the rivers" where Dilmun was said to lie is for her the union of the Tigris and Euphrates rivers at al-Qurnah. A number of scholars have suggested that Dilmun originally designated the eastern province of modern Saudi Arabia, notably linked with the major Dilmunite settlements of Umm an-Nussi and Umm ar-Ramadh in the interior and Tarout on the coast.

=== Garden of Eden theory ===
Scholar Juris Zarins believes that the Garden of Eden was situated in Dilmun at the head of the Persian Gulf (present-day Kuwait), where the Tigris and Euphrates Rivers run into the sea, from his research on this area using information from many different sources, including Landsat images from space. In this theory, the Bible's Gihon would correspond with the Karun in Iran, and the Pishon River would correspond to the Wadi al-Batin river system that once drained the now dry, but once quite fertile central part of the Arabian Peninsula.

== Known rulers ==
Only a few rulers of the Dilmun kingdom are known:

1. Ziusudra (27th century BC)
2. Rimun (c. 1780 BC)
3. Yagli-El, son of Rimun
4. Sumu-lěl (c. 1650 BC)
5. Usiananuri, grandfather of Uballissu-Marduk (precise dates unknown)
6. Ilī-ippašra (contemporary with Burnaburiash II and Kurigalzu II)
7. Operi (c. 710 BC)
8. Hundaru I (c. 650 BC)
9. Qena (c. 680 BC – c. 670 BC)
10. Hundaru II (706–685 BC)

== See also ==
- Bahrain National Museum
- DHL International Aviation ME, a cargo airline using "Dilmun" as radio call sign
- Dilmun Burial Mounds
- Gerrha
- Gilgamesh
- History of Bahrain
- History of Kuwait
- Indus–Mesopotamia relations
- Kuwait National Museum
- Odeh Spring
- Uruk
