= Madinat al-Awda =

- Neighborhood

Arabic transcription(s)
  - Arabic: مَدينَة العودة
  - Latin: Medinat el-Auda (official)
- Interactive map of Madinat al-Awda
- Coordinates: 31°32′36″N 34°27′15″E
- Country: Palestine
- Governorate: Gaza Governorate
- City: Gaza City

Population (2022)
  - Total: 4,233

Madinat al-Awda (Arabic: مَدينَة العودة) is a neighborhood of Gaza City, formerly a Palestinian village, which is located in the Gaza Governorate along the Mediterranean coast in between al-Shati Camp and al-Atatra. Its population in the 1997 Palestinian Central Bureau of Statistics (PCBS) census was 420, rising to 590 in 2006. It is administered by a local development committee under the Palestinian National Authority. In 2022, after being integrated into Gaza City, the neighborhood had a population of 4,233.

During the Gaza war, the neighborhood was occupied by the Israel Defense Forces.
