= Vehicle registration plates of Palestine =

State of Palestine
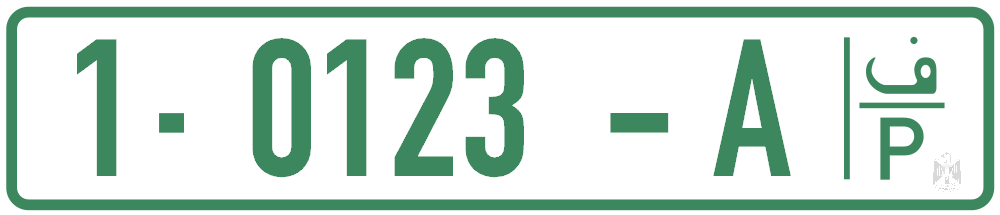
- Palestinian regular legal standard number plate from the West Bank.
- Country: Palestine
- Country code: None (unofficially using Portugal's code, P)

Current series
- Size: 520 mm × 110 mm 20.5 in × 4.3 in
- Serial format: 1-0123-A (West Bank) & 3-0123-45 (Gaza Strip)
- Colour (front): Green on white
- Colour (rear): Green on white

The Palestinian National Authority requires their residents register their motor vehicles and display vehicle registration plates. There are two different registration systems in use: one for West Bank and one in the Gaza Strip.

== West Bank ==
Generally, registration plates in the West Bank have the Latin letter "P" for Palestine or Palestinian Authority on the strip in the right side; above that, the Arabic letter ف (Faa') for فلسطين (Falasteen) or السلطة الفلسطينية (a-Sultat al-Filastiniya).

=== Private vehicles since July 2018 ===
The Palestinian Authority's Ministry of Transport has announced a new numbering system for vehicles registered as of July 2018. According to the new method, vehicles will have a 6-character license number, which includes 5 digits and one Latin letter (as opposed to the previous system where the license number was 7 digits). The change in format was done because the code assigned to Ramallah Governorate was running out of possible combinations. The proposed system will be in the #-####-X format, with the first five digits running in a serial fashion. The last letter in the number will be determined according to the governorate in which the vehicle was registered, and may be:

- The letter A – Jenin
- The letter B – Tulkarm
- The letter C – Tubas
- The letter D – Nablus
- The letter E – Qalqilya
- The letter F – Salfit
- The letter G – Jericho
- The letter H – Ramallah
- The letter J – Jerusalem
- The letter K – Bethlehem
- The letter L – Hebron, Hebron Governorate
- The letter M – Dura, Hebron Governorate
- The letter N – Yatta, Hebron Governorate

The following letters are reserved for the Gaza Strip but have not been implemented yet, as the authorities in Gaza have implemented a different format since 2012:

- The letter P – North Gaza (Jabalia)
- The letter Q – Gaza
- The letter R – Deir al-Balah
- The letter S – Khan Yunis
- The letter T – Rafah

Private vehicle registration plate since 2018: standard size, 520×110 mm

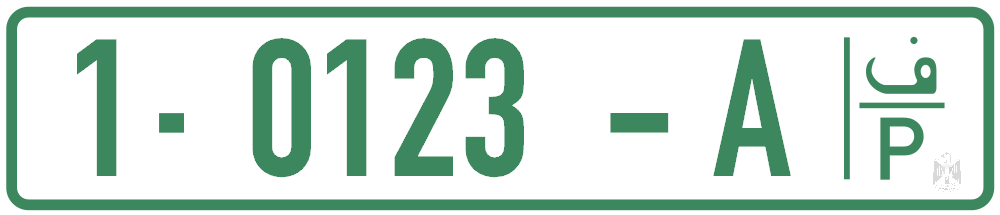

Private vehicle registration plate since 2018, installed on imported vehicles that cannot accommodate a standard 1-line plate: size compliant with the 300×150 mm American standard

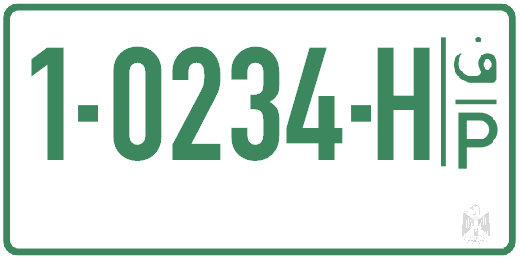

Motorcycle license plates have the same format and are treated as private vehicles, but are issued in two dimensions appropriate for the rear of a motorcycle.

Motorcycle registration plate since 2018: 1-line design, 200×100 mm

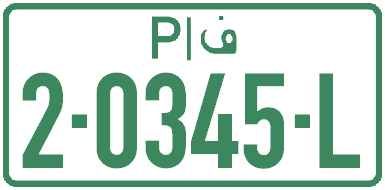

Motorcycle registration plate since 2018: 2-line design, 165×165 mm

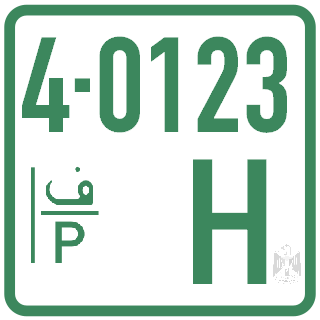

=== Private vehicles between 1994 and July 2018 ===
With the implementation of the Oslo II Accord and the transfer of some of the civil responsibilities in the occupied West Bank and Gaza Strip from Israeli Civil Administration to the Palestinian National Authority in 1994, a new license plate format was introduced to replace the existing format that had been issued by the Israeli Civil Administration.

Private vehicles had white plates with green numbers, the numbers have seven digits, the first shows the district (governorate) of the registration:

Y-XXXX-ZZ

- where Y indicates the district (governorate) and can be:
  - 1: Gaza Strip, for vehicles registered prior to 1995 (North Gaza, Gaza, Central Gaza, Khan Yunis and Rafah Governorates)
  - 3: Gaza Strip, for vehicles registered after 1995 (North Gaza, Gaza, Central Gaza, Khan Yunis and Rafah Governorates) — the initial "3" has been kept after the introduction of the present license plate system in 2012
  - 4: Northern West Bank, for vehicles registered prior to 1995 (Jenin, Nablus, Qalqilya, Salfit, Tubas and Tulkarm Governorates)
  - 5: Central West Bank, for vehicles registered prior to 1995 (Ramallah, Jerusalem and Jericho Governorates)
  - 6: Central West Bank, for vehicles registered after 1995 (Ramallah, Jerusalem and Jericho Governorates)
  - 7: Northern West Bank, for vehicles registered after 1995 (Jenin, Nablus, Qalqilya, Salfit, Tubas and Tulkarm Governorates)
  - 8: Southern West Bank, for vehicles registered prior to 1995 (Bethlehem and Hebron Governorates)
  - 9: Southern West Bank, for vehicles registered after 1995 (Bethlehem and Hebron Governorates)
- X can be any 4-digit number.
- ZZ
  - For privately owned vehicles, "ZZ" can be 40 to 49 and 90 to 98.
  - Generally, vehicles owned by the Palestinian Authority carry the code 99.
  - For vehicles that were registered prior to 1995 (district codes 1, 4, 5, and 8), "ZZ" corresponds to the year in which the car was first registered:
    - 77 to 79 respectively for vehicles registered from 1967 to 1969
    - 70 to 76 respectively for vehicles registered from 1970 to 1976
    - 37 to 39 respectively for vehicles registered from 1977 to 1979
    - 40 to 49 respectively for vehicles registered from 1980 to 1989
    - 90 to 95 respectively for vehicles registered from 1990 to 1995
  - For public for-hire vehicles, "ZZ" is 30
  - For duty and tax-free vehicles (such as ambulances), "ZZ" is 31
  - For vehicles leased with the extension, "ZZ" is 32

Private vehicle registration plate from 1994 to 2018: standard size, 520×110 mm (formerly used in the Gaza Strip until 2012)

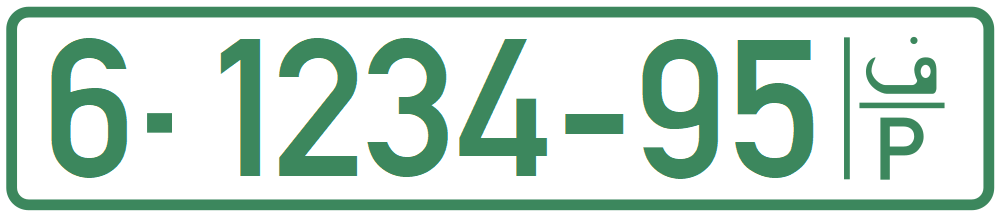

Private vehicle registration plate from 1994 to 2018, installed on imported vehicles that cannot accommodate a standard 1-line plate: size compliant with the 300×150 mm American standard

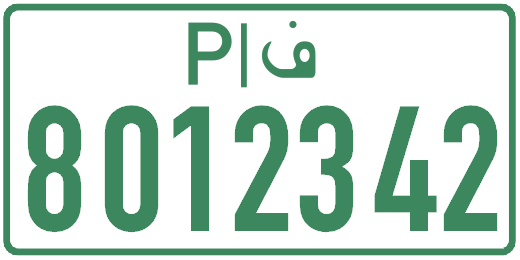

For the first few years of issuance of this format until 2005, the shape and design of the license plate was slightly different. The positioning and the style of the Arabic letter "ف" and the English letter "P" on the right hand side differed, with the Arabic letter being on the bottom and "P" on the top. The license plate also featured an embossed green Eagle of Saladdin, the official emblem of Palestine.

Private vehicle registration plates from 1994: earlier style, standard size, 520×110 mm

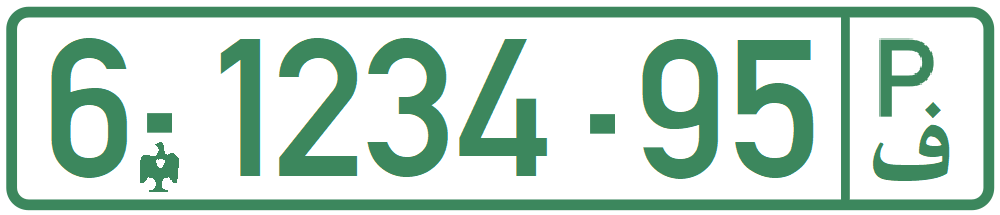

Private vehicle registration plate from 1994; earlier style, installed on imported vehicles that cannot accommodate a standard 1-line plate: size compliant with the 300×150 mm American standard

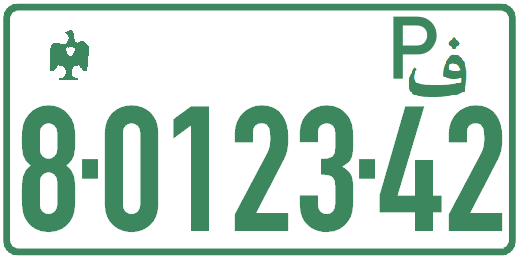

Motorcycle license plates had the same format and were treated as private vehicles, but were issued in two dimensions appropriate for the rear of a motorcycle.

Motorcycle registration plate from 1994 to 2018: 1-line design, 200×100 mm

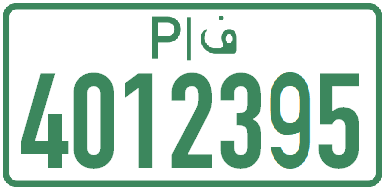

Motorcycle registration plate from 1994 to 2018, 2-line design, 165×165 mm

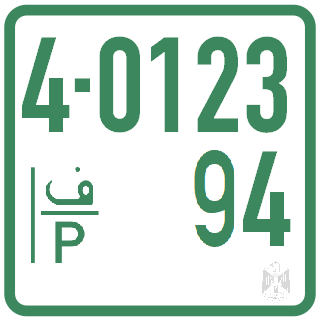

=== Public transport ===
Public transport vehicles such as taxis, shared taxis and buses have green plates with white numbers. Taxi plates always end in "30".

Public vehicle registration plate from 1994: standard size, 520×110 mm (used in the Gaza Strip until 2012)

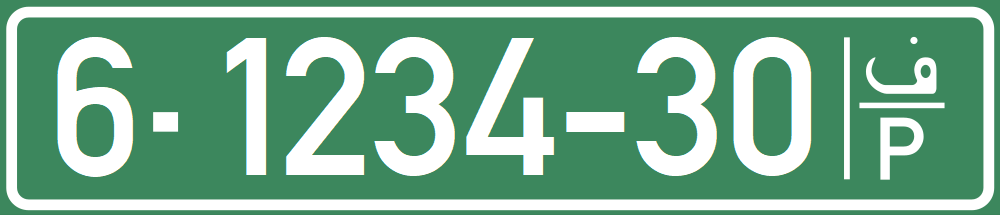

=== Plates for government vehicles ===
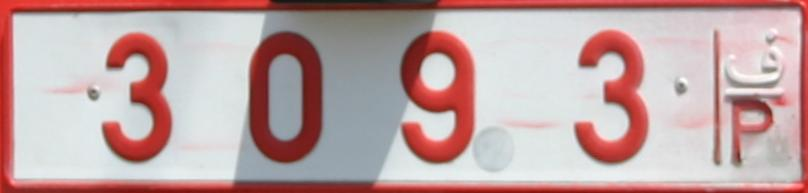
Current Palestinian Authority government vehicle registration plate

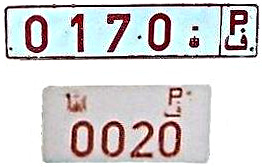
Older Palestinian Authority government vehicle registration plate

Vehicles belonging to the Palestinian Authority such as officials' cars, ambulances, fire brigade police and special military police use white number plates with red numbers in the XXXX format with leading zeros.

Government vehicle registration plate from 1994: standard size, 520×110 mm (used in the Gaza Strip until 2012)

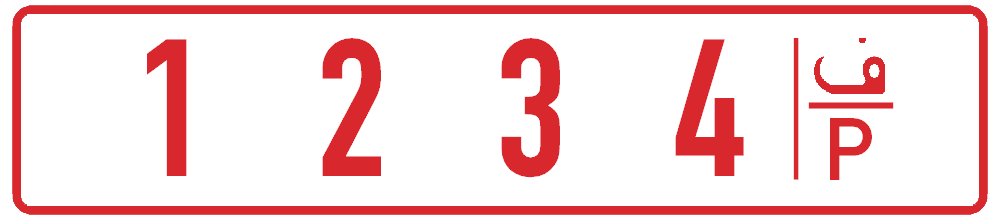

For the first few years of issuance of this format until 2005, the shape and design of the license plate was slightly different.

Government vehicle registration plate from 1994: standard size, 520×110 mm (used in the Gaza Strip until 2012)

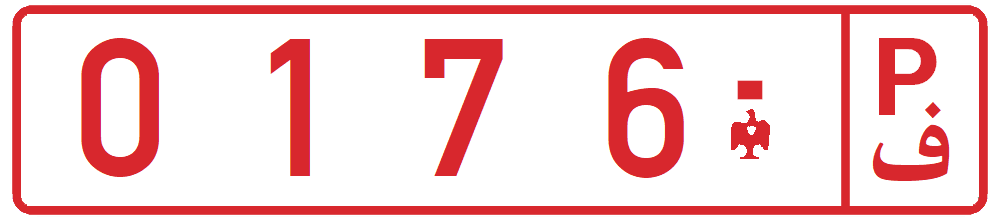

Currently, newly registered police vehicles receive green-on-white plates ending in "99".

=== Stolen vehicle plates ===
This class of license plates, unique in the world, is the outcome of the complications related to the Israeli–Palestinian peace process.

With the signing of Gaza–Jericho Agreement, establishment of the Palestinian Civil Police Force, and replacement of Israel Police in most areas of the Gaza Strip with the former, Israeli car thieves fenced about 15,000 stolen cars into the Gaza Strip, where they were then sold away from the reach of Israel Police. Israeli car owners, unable to retrieve their cars, would be reimbursed by their insurance, and they would buy new cars. In effect, this resulted in Israeli insurance companies paying for Gaza's used car trade. When the insurance companies sued, the Palestinian Authority settled and the settlement cost was offset in part by increased registration fees for cars that had been stolen: to designate those cars, they were given special license plates. These license plates had black texts and black borders on a white background. On the right hand side, instead of having the "P / ف" national identifiers, as was the norm with other types of registration plates, they had "ف / م". The Arabic letter "م" stands for المقيدة, meaning "restricted", and was effectively a euphemism referring to the vehicle's origins. By 2005, the Palestinian Authority phased this class of license plates out and replaced them with typical license plates.

The format of these license plates was YY-XXX, where YY could have been:

- 25 for government vehicles
- 26 for police vehicles
- 27-30 for privately owned vehicles

Stolen vehicle registration plate from 1994: standard size, 520×110 mm (used until 2005)

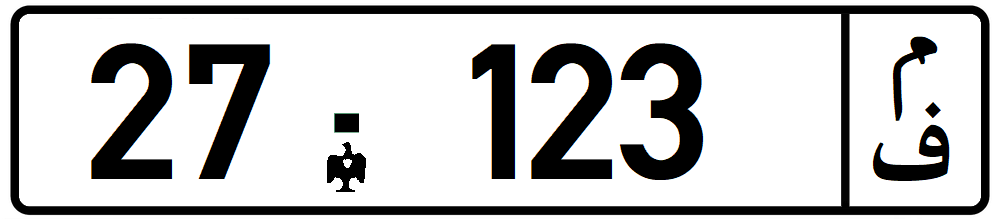

=== Test plates ===
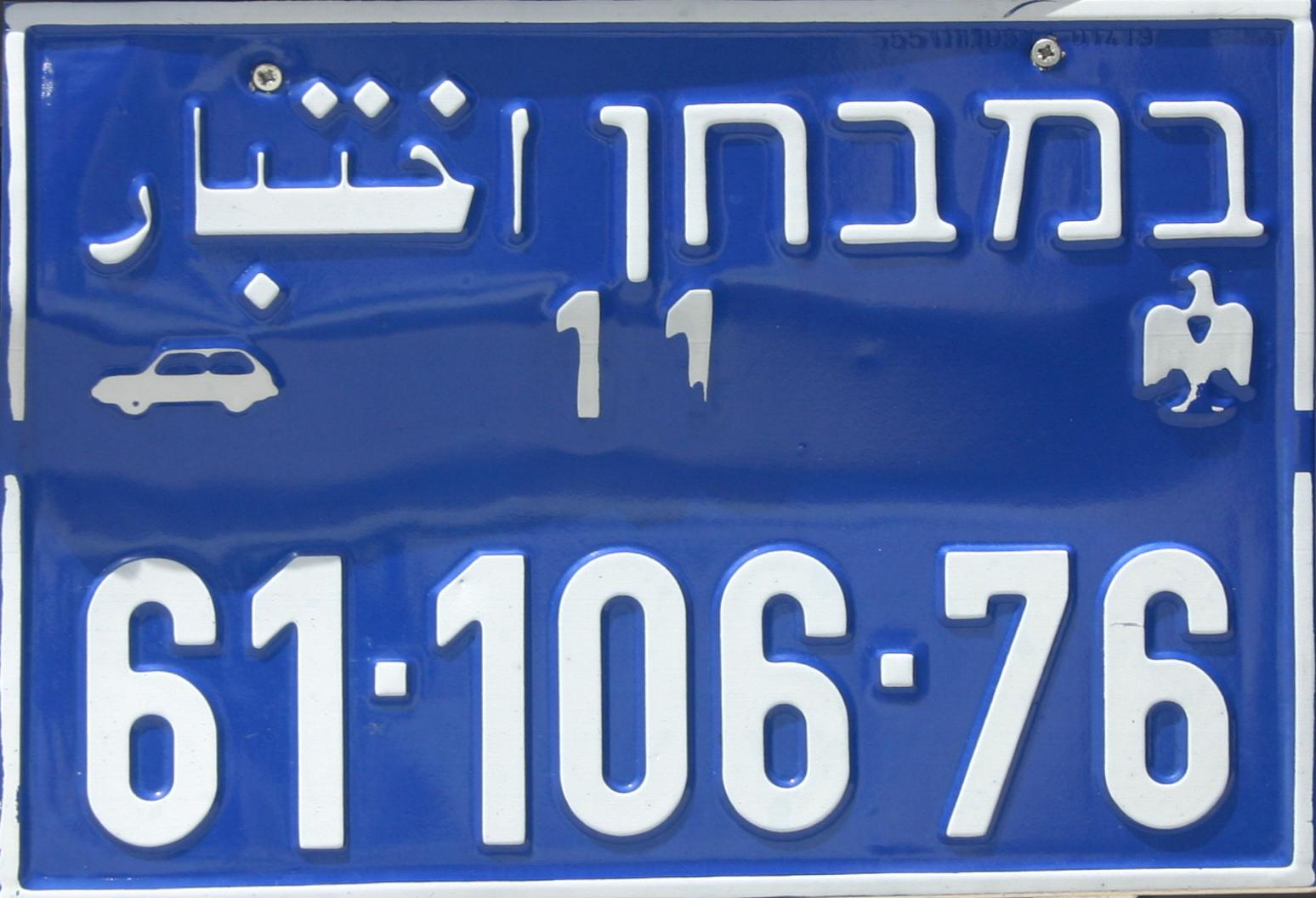
Test license plate

Test plates for garages and car importers are blue with white text and display the word "TEST" in Arabic (اختبار) and Hebrew (במבחן) above the number.

== Gaza Strip ==
Until 2012 registration plates in the Gaza Strip had the same format as in the West Bank. In 2012, Hamas, replaced the PNA license plates described above with a new design. The new plates have a vertical Palestinian flag on the right (instead of the letters P/ف) in European style plate or horizontal flag on the top in American style plates. All the plates have white background. All numbers start with "3".

=== Private and governmental personal vehicles ===
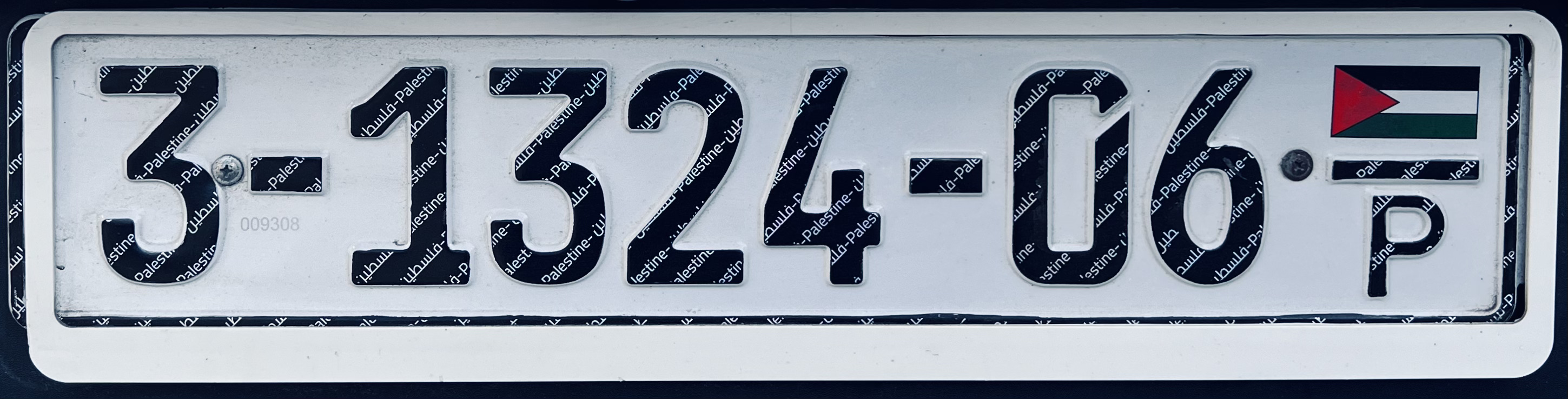

Standard size, 520×110 mm

Private and personal vehicles have black digits and borders. Private vehicle plate numbers end with "0X". Governmental personal vehicle numbers ending with "5X.

In 2021, vehicle license plates in the Gaza Strip underwent a design change, with a pattern of the word "Palestine" in Arabic and English overlaid on the numbers, and a horizontal Palestinian flag in place of the previous vertical, downward-facing flag.

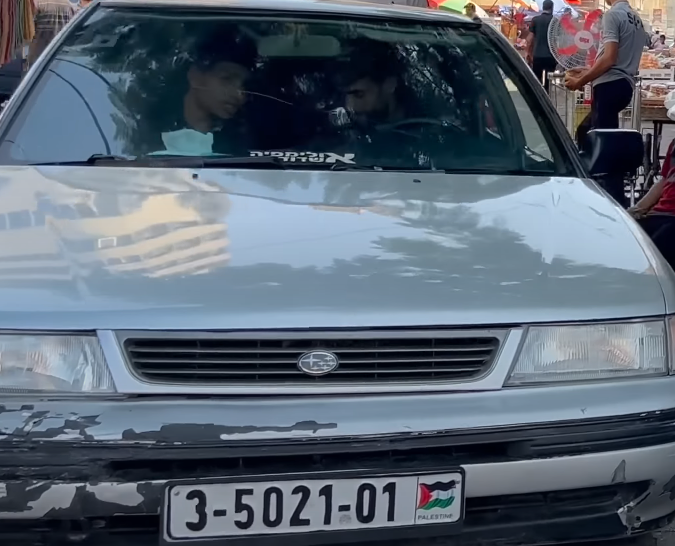
Vehicle with 2021 Gaza Strip registration plate design

Motorcycle plates are rarely installed in the Gaza Strip.

=== Commercial vehicles ===
Commercial vehicles such as trucks have green digits and borders, with numbers ending in "1X".

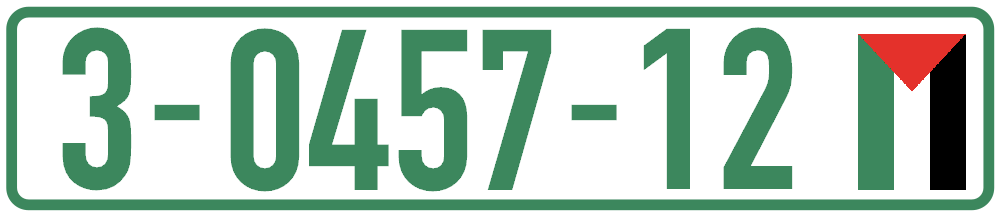

Installed on imported vehicles that cannot accommodate a standard 1-line plate: size compliant with the 300×150 mm American standard

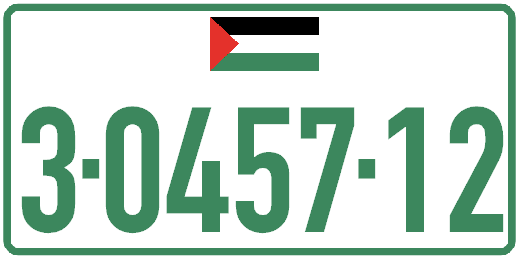

=== Public vehicles ===
Public vehicles such as taxis and municipal vehicles have blue digits and borders. Public vehicle plate numbers end in "2X", while municipal vehicle plate numbers end in "4X".

Standard size, 520×110 mm

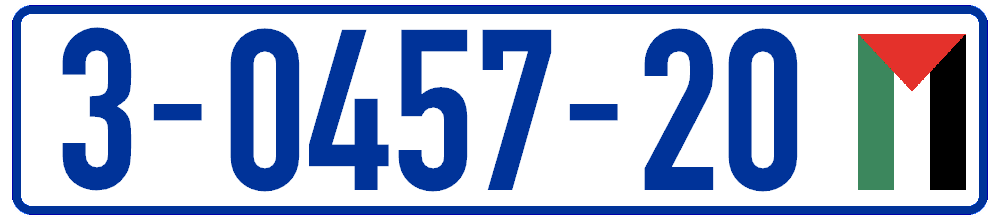

Installed on imported vehicles that cannot accommodate a standard 1-line plate: size compliant with the 300×150 mm American standard

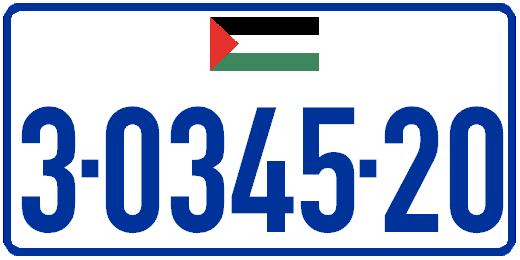

=== Governmental vehicles ===
Governmental vehicles such as police cars, ambulances operated by the Ministry of Health and others have red digits and borders, with numbers ending in "5X".

Standard size, 520×110 mm

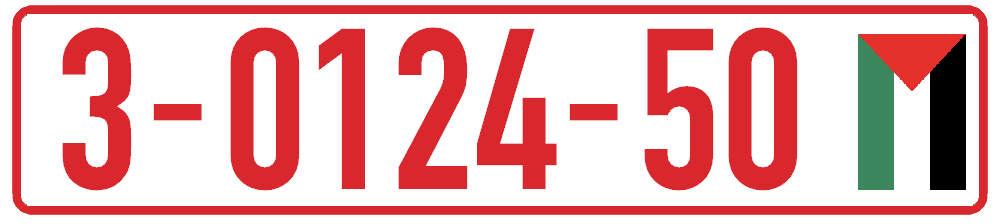

Installed on imported vehicles that cannot accommodate a standard 1-line plate: size compliant with the 300×150 mm American standard

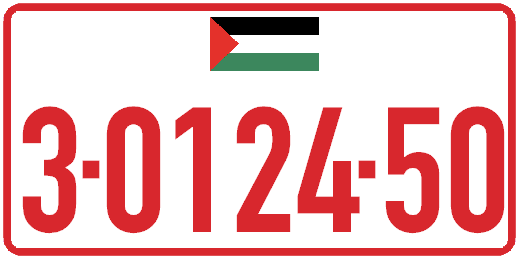

== 1967–1994 ==
During this period of the Israeli governance of the West Bank and Gaza Strip, Palestinians had license plates issued by the Israeli civil administration.

=== West Bank ===
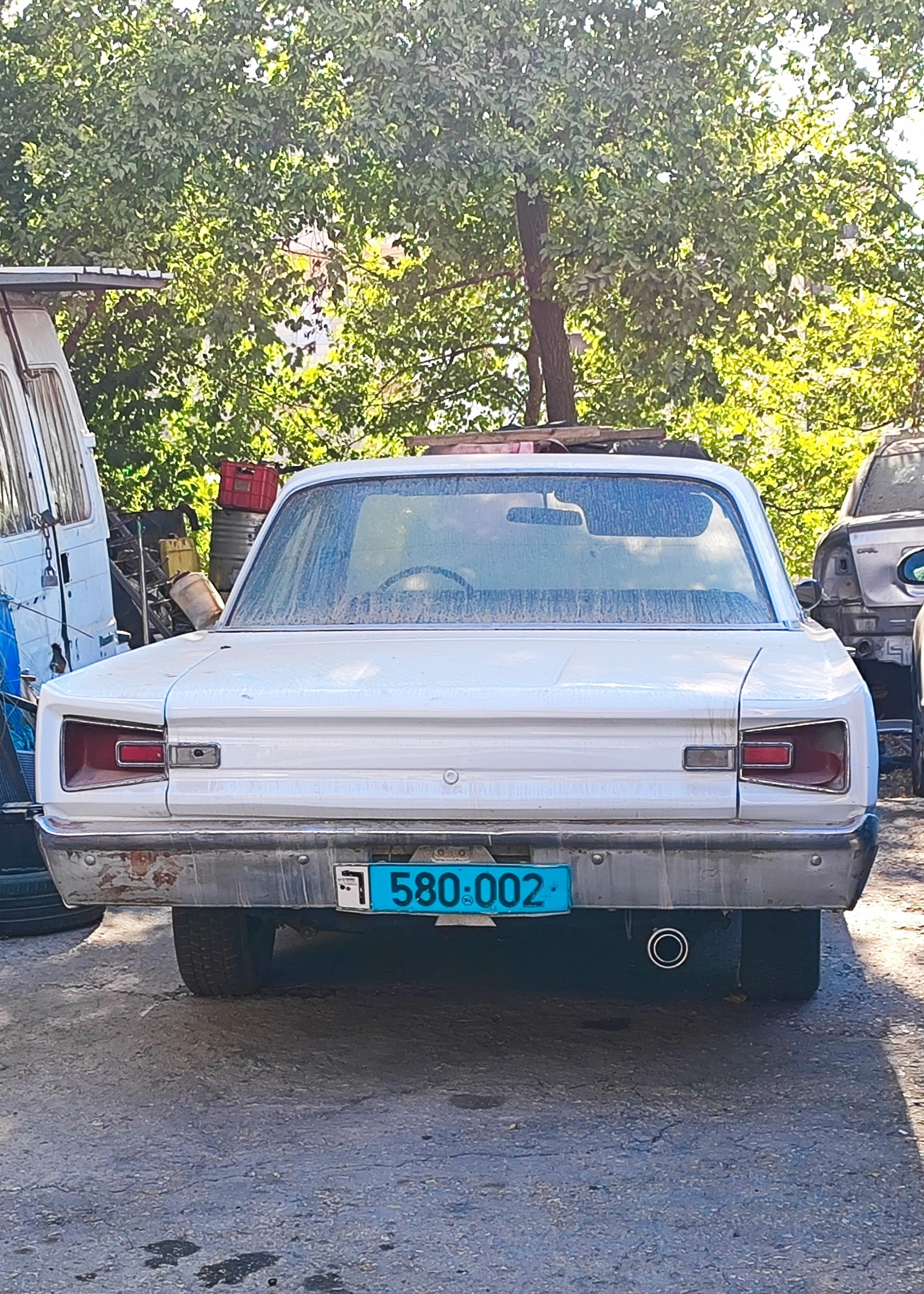
1966 Dodge Coronet with Ramallah registration plates, Ramallah, Palestine

West Bank license plates had black text and black borders on a light blue background. Each region was assigned a Hebrew letter code. Initially, this letter code was placed on a separate square plate, and installed adjacent to the license plate. Later, in from late 1970s onward, the letter was incorporated onto the license plates, on the left hand side. The letter code was black on a background of either white or orange. White background generally implied that the vehicle owner lived in a city in the West Bank, whereas orange indicated that the owner lived in one of the towns and villages in the vicinity. For plate sizes specific to imported vehicles that could only accommodate an American-sized license plate, this letter was inside a white or orange rectangle, at the top, above the numbers.

These letter codes do not correspond to the modern Governorates of Palestine. For example, there was no code for what's today Tubas Governorate, and the corresponding area was treated as subdivisions of Jenin. Palestinian towns and villages in Jerusalem Governorate but outside the municipal boundaries of the unilaterally annexed areas of East Jerusalem were either treated as subdivisions of Ramallah or Bethlehem depending on the location.

For about two years, from 1967 to 1969, West Bank license plates consisted of five digits. They had six digits until near the end of 1970s, and since then, they had seven digits. The seven-digit format was XX-XXX-XX, similar to those of Israeli cars. The last two numbers in the West Bank (XX) were either "1X" or "3X", whereas Israel avoided using these numbers on the yellow-coloured Israeli plates, thus avoiding the issue of duplicate numbers under the two parallel systems.

- א – Jericho (יריחו, Arabic: أريحا, which transliterates into Hebrew as אריחא)
- ב – Bethlehem (בית לחם)
- ח – Hebron (חברון)
- ט – Tulkarem (טול כרם)
- נ – Jenin (ג׳נין)
- ק – Qalqilya (קלקיליה)
- ר – Ramallah (רמאללה)
- ש – Nablus (שכם, Šəḵem)

=== Gaza Strip ===
Gaza Strip license plates had black letters and black borders on a white background, differing from the West Bank plates, as well as with the yellow Israeli plates. Similar to the occupied West Bank, each region was assigned a Hebrew letter code. Initially, this letter code was placed on a separate square plate, and installed adjacent to the license plate. Later, in from late 1970s onward, the letter was incorporated onto the license plates, on the left side, on a white background, and surrounded by a uniquely shaped, round-cornered rectangle. However, the format was slightly changed in late 1980s, with the letter code being moved to the right hand side, and having unique colours as opposed to black, for each of the 3 districts.

- ד – Deir al-Balah (דיר אלבלח)
- ע – Gaza (עזה)
- פ – Rafah (רפיח)
