= Awdah Ahmad Awdah Salem =

Executed Yemeni serial killer

- Born: Yemen
- Died: August 7, 2014; Yanbu, Saudi Arabia
- Cause of death: Execution by beheading
- Other name: "The Yanbu Serial Killer"
- Status: Executed
- Conviction: Murder (3 counts)
- Penalty: Death

Details
- Victims: 3
- Span of crimes: 2007–2009
- Country: Saudi Arabia
- State: Medina
- Date apprehended: 2009

Awdah Ahmad Awdah Salem (died August 7, 2014), known as The Yanbu Serial Killer, was a Yemeni serial killer who killed three Indonesian housemaids in Yanbu, Saudi Arabia, between 2007 and 2009. He was convicted and subsequently executed for his crimes in 2014.

== Crimes ==
Salem, a Yemeni expatriate who had been living in the country with his family for several years, had previously been arrested for abusing his wife and children. He was imprisoned under a false name, as he always carried several forged documents and passports, presenting himself as a Saudi student before the authorities.

He committed his first crime on September 8, 2007, near the beginning of Ramadan. For some time, Salem had maintained a relationship with an Indonesian maid, Halima, over the phone, and managed to persuade her to run away with him. The pair met at the northern corniche of Yanbu, where Salem picked her up in his car and subsequently drove her to one of his home. There, he raped and beat Halima with a stick, before finally smothering her with a pillow. To get rid of the body, he buried it in a sand dune near the Al-Nakhil Highway. The crime went unnoticed, and Salem managed to slip by undetected.

Around a year and a half later, he spotted another maid sitting alone in a car park in Yanbu's industrial area. Salem approached the victim and persuaded her to follow him to a remote area. When he made sure the coast was clear, he proceeded to rape and then choke the woman to death. To ensure that she was dead, he picked up a big stone and hit her three times on the head with it. The body was then put in a garbage bag, and buried near the murder scene. Again, the crime was never reported to authorities, and Salem returned home shortly after.

In 2009, Salem committed his final murder. He had met another maid near the Al Asyaly footbridge, and convinced her to follow him to his house. There, he attempted to rape the woman, while his family was still inside the house. The woman managed to fight him off and run for her life, but Salem chased her down and stabbed her three times, killing her on the spot. He then dragged the body to his car and brought it back home, where he poured either benzene or acid on it, causing severe burns on the corpse. Like the previous victims, he then proceeded to bury the remains and return home.

== Trial, conviction and execution ==
By the time of the third murder, local police were made aware of the disappearances, but without any leads, they couldn't make an arrest. Four months after the investigation had started, they arrested Salem's son on charges of begging. While incarcerated, the boy told them that he had seen his father stabbing a woman on the street. Interested in this potential lead, they started monitoring Salem's activities, and eventually arrested him when they found out that he had been using forged passports. While examining his house and possessions, they found additional passports, as well as photographs of housemaids on his mobile phone. Upon closer inspection, it was discovered that one of the women was indeed a missing victim. Salem was questioned by investigators, and confessed to the crimes, pointing out all of the burial sites scattered around Yanbu.

In 2010, he was put on trial for the murders, as well as additional charges of rape and adultery. Prosecutors demanded that, under Sharia law, the defendant should be executed if found guilty, in order to deter any further copycat murders. Salem denied all charges, and announced that if convicted, he would appeal the sentence to the Supreme Judicial Council of Saudi Arabia. He was found guilty and sentenced to death by beheading, and his subsequent appeal was rejected. On August 7, 2014, Salem was publicly executed in Yanbu.

== See also ==
- List of serial killers by country
