= Odeh Spring =

Odeh Spring عين عودة
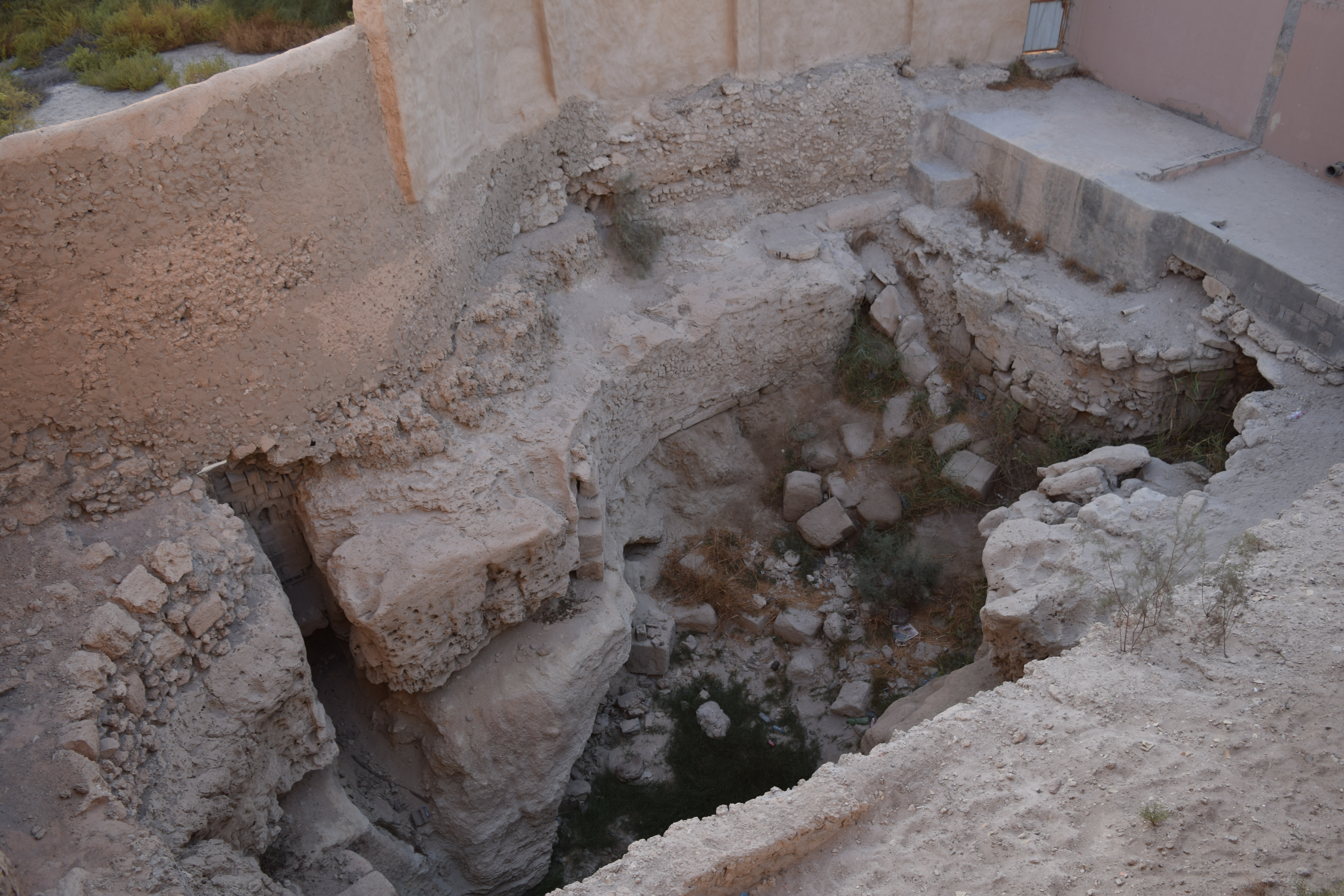

- Location within Saudi Arabia
- Coordinates: 25°23′N 49°36′E
- Country: Saudi Arabia
- Time zone: UTC+3

Odeh Spring (Ain Al-Odeh عين العودة in Arabic, also called Fauces Spring, Tarout Spring or Castle Spring) is a historical natural underground deep sulphur spring in Saudi Arabia, Eastern Province, Qatif, specifically in Tarout Island. Odeh Spring history goes back more than four thousand years. It contained mineral water where people utilized it to cure diseases and illnesses. Odeh Spring used to produce hot water and vapor in winter, and tepid water in the summer. In spite of all the different attempts and efforts to revive it, the spring is currently depleted.

== Labelling ==
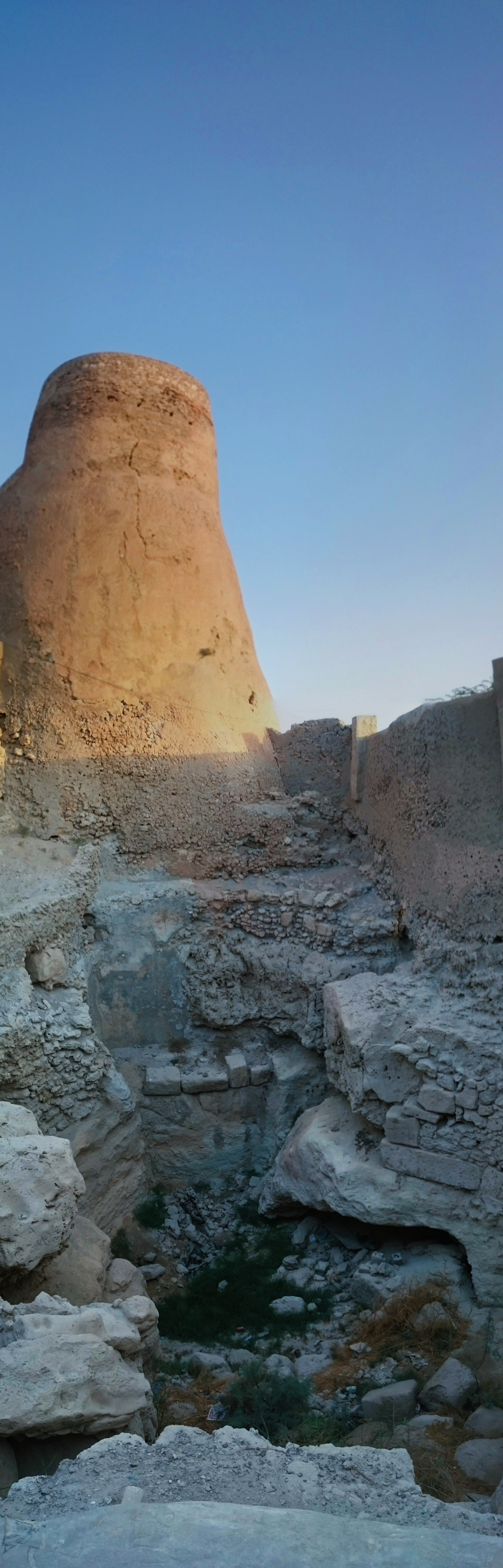
Northeast Tarot Castle Tower, Odeh Spring

“Odeh” is a dialect word in Qatif which means “old”. Thus, it was called Odeh spring to indicate that it belongs to the very distant past.

== Construction ==
One side of the spring is bordering north tower of Traout castle, while the other three sides are walled.

== Local beliefs ==
Those who were living in Tarout in different past civilizations believed that the water of the spring was sacred. Moreover, the spring was only dedicated for women at first to benefit from it. Interestingly, old women narrated a story of a rock falling into the spring with a painting on the other side of the rock demonstrating a statue of a woman with prominent breasts. Small fishes called Hawarseen (Arabic: حوارسين) used to live in Odeh Spring along with other large fishes and frogs. In fact, Odeh Spring was a destination for sailors and divers from the Gulf countries and east coast, especially ones from Kuwait and Bahrain.

== Geology ==
Ain Al-Odeh contains burrows and a natural furnace very close to Tarout castle base as it is engraved inside the rocks surrounding the construction foundation of the castle. Fauces are also branching out from Odeh spring and it was mentioned by the Danish archaeologist Thomas Geoffrey Bibby in his book “Dilmun”. Tributaries were formed from Odeh spring and streams to the south providing the northeast of the nearby town Dareen with water, until the year 1937, and continues to run before it eventually pours into the sea after crossing over 1,500 meters. Odeh spring consists of four layers: First, the outer cavity layer that shapes the outer construction of the spring. Second, salient rocks in the inner walls of the spring. Third, the narrowest, confined aquifer where water runs from to farmlands. Fourth, the bottom of the spring which is a sedimentary layer where underground water flows from the ground.
