= Gaza Governorate =

Governorate of Palestine

Coordinates: 31.52°N 34.45°E

Gaza Governorate محافظة غزة
- Governorate
- Interactive map of Gaza Governorate
- Country: Palestine
- Territory: Gaza Strip

Area
  - Total: 70 km^{2} (27 sq mi)

Population (2017)
  - Total: 652,597
  - Density: 9,300/km^{2} (24,000/sq mi)
- ISO 3166 code: PS-GZA

The Gaza Governorate (Arabic: محافظة غزة, romanized: Muḥāfaẓat Ġazza), also alternatively known as Gaza City Governorate, is one of the 16 Governorates of Palestine, located in the north central Gaza Strip. Gaza is claimed by the State of Palestine, but the land is under the partial control of Hamas, while around a third of the governorate, its border with Israel, airspace, and maritime territory, are all controlled by the IDF. According to the Palestinian Central Bureau of Statistics, the district's population was 505,700 in 2006. All of its seats were won by Hamas members in the 2006 parliamentary elections. It is governed by Mohammed Qadoura.

The governorate consists of one city, three towns and a number of refugee camps.

== Localities ==
=== Cities ===
- Gaza City (includes Madinat al-Awda since 2022)

=== Village councils ===
- Juhor ad-Dik
- Al-Mughraqa (Abu Middein)
- Al-Zahra

=== Refugee camps ===
- Al-Shati (Shati) (Beach camp)

== Sources ==
- Gaza Governorate Localities
