= Adua =

Adua may refer to:

- Adwa, a town in northern Ethiopia
- Italian submarine Adua
- El Idwa, a city in the Minya Governorate, Egypt
