= Vehicle registration plates of Israel =

State of Israel
- Israeli regular legal standard number plate (Euro-sized).
- Country: Israel
- Country code: IL

Current series
- Size: 520 mm × 110 mm 20.5 in × 4.3 in
- Serial format: 123-45-678
- Colour (front): Black on yellow
- Colour (rear): Black on yellow

Israeli vehicle registration plate identifier

In Israel, vehicle registration plates are used on motor vehicles and trailers for official identification purposes.

Israeli registration plates are issued by various approved licensing firms, like Dinamometer, and according to Specification no. 327 of the Standards Institute of Israel. Most regulations regarding Israeli vehicle registration plates are listed among the transport regulations, issued by the Ministry of Transport and Road Safety. These regulations define the proper placement of the plates, as well as other issues concerning the usage of the plates.

== Appearance ==
=== Civil registration plates ===
Israeli civil registration plates are rectangular with reflecting yellow background and embossed with black registration number. Under the first dash of the registration number (see below form of registration numbers) there is a stamp of approval of the Standards Institute of Israel. On the left side of the plate there is a euroband embossed with the Israeli flag and beneath it the letters IL and ישראל (Israel) written in Hebrew and below it إسرائيل (Israel) written in Arabic. Old plates do not hold this euroband. In American standard plates (300 × 150 mm), the digits are narrower and the blue rectangle is at the bottom of the plate, as the letters are to the right of the flag.

These plates are issued to Israeli citizens, whether they live in Israel-proper (including annexed territories of Golan Heights and East Jerusalem) or in the West Bank, as well as to Syrian citizens inhabiting in the Golan Heights, and Palestinian residents of East Jerusalem. Vehicles with this format of license plates are free to cross the Green Line, but not into the Gaza Strip unless they receive a permit from COGAT. Palestinians living in the West Bank and Gaza Strip are issued a different registration plate format by the Palestinian Authority. (Note: Prior to 1994, the Israeli civil administration issued vehicles from these Palestinian territories with separately-designated registration plates.) The owners of these vehicles need to apply for a permit from COGAT if they want to cross the Green Line or exit the Gaza Strip.

Vehicles registered in Israel often use "disguised" plates, either remade black on white without the blue band, or with the blue band covered, when travelling outside of the country.

=== Current format—eight digits ===
Current civil registration numbers (since July 2017) consist of eight digits, separated by dashes between the third and fourth digits and between the fifth and sixth digits (XXX-XX-XXX).

In this format, the first six digits are the registration code. The last two digits are the series of the license plate, which start from 01 and only go up when the first six digits reach their limit (999-99-9##). Thus, the code pattern follow this:

- From 100-00-001 to 999-99-901
- Then, 01 becomes 02 and the rest of the code resets, thus:
- From 100-00-002 to 999-99-902
- Then 100-00-003 to 999-99-903
- and onward...

Typical one-line license plate, having a size compliant with that of European Union license plates, 520 × 110 mm

Typical two-line license plate, installed on imported vehicles that can't accommodate a standard one-line plate. Size compliant with American standard 300 × 150 mm

Motorcycle, Moped, and Scooter License Plate. 165 × 175 mm

=== 1980–2017 – 7 digits ===
Registration numbers from 1980 to 2017 were seven digits, separated by dashes between the second and third digits and between the fifth and sixth digits (XX-XXX-XX). Older registration numbers, which are still seen in Israel, consist of five or six digits with one dash placed prior to the last three digits (XX-XXX or XXX-XXX). Vehicles from the same importer or brand usually have the two last digits in common. Special numbers consisting of identical digits or other patterns, may be granted as a premium by the dealership.

While the vehicle registration numbers of taxis in Israel always end with either 25 or 26, the last two digits of buses vary, although many end with 01. Many self-imported cars end with 00, as well as many trucks. Plate numbers ending with 4x and 9x are currently not in use.

Typical 1-line license plate, having a size compliant with that of European Union license plates, 520 x 110 mm

Typical 2-line license plate, installed on imported vehicles that can't accommodate a standard 1-line plate. Size compliant with American standard 300 x 150 mm

Motorcycle, Moped, and Scooter License Plate. 165 x 175 mm

=== Antique vehicle registration plates ===
Antique vehicles, which in Israel are vehicles over 30 years of age, may be specifically registered and carry special registration plates, which in addition to the registration number contain the words רכב אספנות (lit. "collectibles" vehicle). These vehicles, while exempt from annual registration costs, may not be driven on a public road between 07:00 and 09:00 on a workday. Since February 2011, self-imported antique vehicles are allocated a number plate with the 55 suffix.

Israeli Antique vehicles registration plate

=== Police registration plates ===
Typical 1-line license plate, having a size compliant with that of European Union license plates, 520 x 110 mm

Typical 2-line license plate, installed on imported vehicles that can't accommodate a standard 1-line plate. Size compliant with American standard 300 x 150 mm

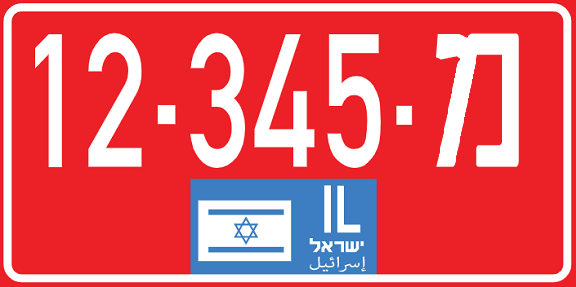

Police registration plates are rectangular with red background and embossed with white registration number. Police registration numbers consist of the letter mem (מ), representing the word "mishtara" (Hebrew: משטרה, meaning: police) and the number, which is issued according to the seniority of the car holder. The number of the main car of the General Commissioner of the Israel Police is 1.

=== Military registration plates ===

Registration plates of military service vehicles are rectangular with black background and embossed with a white registration number. Military registration numbers consist of the letter tsade (צ), representing the word "Tsahal" (Israeli Defense Forces) and several digits. Alternatively, the plate might be painted on the vehicle.

=== Military police registration plates ===

Military police registration plates are rectangular with blue background and embossed with white registration number. Military police registration numbers consist of the letters mem and tsade, representing the words "mishtara tsva'it" (military police) and several digits.

=== Diplomatic registration plates ===

Diplomatic Corps/Consular Corps registration plates are rectangular with white background and embossed with black registration number. Diplomatic/Consular Corps registration numbers consist of the letters CD/CC (respectively) and seven digits—the last two of them are 21 or 22. Private vehicles owned by a member of a diplomatic/consular mission and originally brought from the member's country of origin do not carry the letters CD/CC, but the last two digits remain 21 or 22. Honorary consuls' vehicles carry plates consisting of the letters CC without the final digits of 21 or 22, even though the vehicle is registered under a civil registration number.

==== List of codes ====
First digits	Ends with 21	Ends with 22
10	Kenya	Slovakia
11	Slovenia	Belarus
12	Taiwan	Ethiopia
13	Cyprus	Ecuador
14	Jordan	Argentina
15	Latvia	United States
16	Moldova	El Salvador
17	Rwanda	Bulgaria
18	Morocco	Bolivia
19	Kazakhstan	Myanmar
20	Gabon	Belgium
21	Lithuania	Brazil
22	United Nations	United Kingdom
23	United Nations	Russia
24		Ghana
25		Guatemala
26		South Africa
27	Albania	Denmark
28	Haiti	Sri Lanka
29	Angola	India
30	Bosnia and Herzegovina	Netherlands
31	Estonia	Hungary
32		Honduras
33		Germany
34		Dominican Republic
35		Venezuela
36		Vatican City
37	United Arab Emirates	Serbia
38		Greece
39		Japan
40		Vatican City
42		United Nations
43	United States	United States
44		Zambia
45		Liberia
46		Mexico
47		Croatia
48		Egypt
49		Nigeria
50		Norway
53		Nepal
55		Cameroon
56		China
57		Uzbekistan
58	United States	United States
59		Spain
60		Togo
61		Poland
62		Portugal
63		Philippines
64		Finland
65		Panama
66		Georgia
67		Paraguay
68		Peru
69		Chile
71		Czech Republic
72		France
73		Vietnam
74		Colombia
75		Costa Rica
77		Canada
78		Romania
79		Sweden
80	Tanzania	Switzerland
81		South Korea
82		Turkey
83	North Macedonia	United States
84		Thailand
85		United Nations
86		DR Congo
87		Malta
88		Ivory Coast
90		Ukraine
91		South Sudan
92		United Nations
93		Austria
94		Australia
95		Uruguay
96		Italy
97		France
98		Ireland
99		European Union

== 7-digit format registration plate suffixes ==
The use of the 7-digit registration plate in Israel began in 1980. It ended in 2018 for cars and buses, but still used for Taxis until all numbers in the 25 and 26 series run out. The 2 last digits of the number, referred to as its suffix, have special meaning. In the eighties, the suffix indicated the vehicle's manufacturing year (80–89). In 1990 this rule was changed, and the suffix was determined according to the car's dealer or brand, when each dealer or brand was given a suffix, sometimes sharing the same suffix with other dealers or brands. This rule was gradually changed starting from 2000, and the suffix started to indicate the vehicle's manufacturing year again (although not according to a general rule as in the eighties) as well as dealer or brand.

The following table details the registration plates’ suffixes in Israel against the vehicle's manufacturing year and the car's dealer or brand. The table details private and small commercial cars only. It does not indicate suffixes that were allocated to the Palestinian Authority in the past.

A list of Israel's car dealers and the brands they import follows this table.

Suffix	Manufacture year	Brand/dealer
00		Self imported vehicles, all brands, since 1990. Mercedes
01	2005	Colmobil (Dealer), Lubinsky (Dealer), buses, 2-wheel vehicles
02	1990-1994	Mitsubishi
03	1990-1995	Japanauto (Dealer)
04	1990-1997	Lubinsky (Dealer), Hyundai, Daihatsu
05	1990-1995	Samlat (Dealer), Automotive Equipment Group (Dealer), Jaguar, Ford
06	1990-1995	UMI (Dealer), Meir (Dealer), Carasso (Dealer), Kamor (Dealer)
07	1990-1995	Champion (Dealer), Daihatsu, Daewoo
08	1990-1997	UMI (Dealer), Meir (Dealer), Kamor (Dealer), Rover
	1995-1996	Japanauto (Dealer)
	2016	Meir (Dealer)
09	1990-1996	Alfa Romeo, Lancia, Skoda, Mazda, Toyota, Lada
10	2000-2001	All manufacturers
	2001-2004	Skoda
11	2013-2014	All manufacturers
12	2012-2013	All manufacturers
13	2006	All manufacturers
	2007	Daihatsu
	2012-2013	All manufacturers
14	2006	All manufacturers. Re-registration in case the first (left-most) digit is 9. (9X-XXX-14)
15		Self import vehicles, re-registration (until 2005), heavy vehicles, former police cars
16	1997-2011	Kamor (Dealer)
	1995-1999	Lubinsky (Dealer), Carasso (Dealer), Daewoo
	2005	Champion (Dealer), Delek Motors (Dealer)
17	1995-1999	UMI (Dealer), Meir (Dealer), Mitsubishi, Hyundai
	1999-2004	Jaguar, Rover, Land Rover
18	1996-2000	UMI (Dealer), Champion (Dealer)
19	1995-1999	UMI (Dealer), Delek Motors (Dealer), Automotive Equipment Group (Dealer), Daewoo, Daihatsu, Toyota
20	1995-1999	Colmobil (Dealer)
21	Since 1980	Diplomatic vehicle (with "CD" at the left) or Consulate vehicle (with "CC" at the left) or Red Cross vehicle (with "ICRC" at the left), white background, All manufacturers
22	Since 1980	Diplomatic vehicle (with "CD" at the left) or Consulate vehicle (with "CC" at the left) or Red Cross vehicle (with "ICRC" at the left), white background, All manufacturers
23	1996-2004	Subaru
	2000	Most manufacturers
24	2000-2001	Most manufacturers
25	Since 1986	Taxi, All manufacturers
26	Since 2013	Taxi, All manufacturers
27	1996-2000	Fiat, Kia, Suzuki, Mazda
28	1996-2002	Automotive Equipment Group (Dealer)
	1995-1998	Delek Motors (Dealer), Mercedes
	2016	Automotive Equipment Group (Dealer)
29	1996-1998	Carasso (Dealer)
	1997	Mazda
	2000-2001	Delek Motors (Dealer), Carasso (Dealer)
30	1997	Daewoo, Daihatsu
	2014	All manufacturers
31	2014	All manufacturers
32	2014-2015	All manufacturers
33	2015	All manufacturers
34	2015-2016	All manufacturers
35	2001-2002	All manufacturers
36	2002-2003	All manufacturers
37	2015-2016	All manufacturers
38	2015-2016	All manufacturers
39	2016	All manufacturers
40	2016-2017	All manufacturers
41		Re-registration of "collectibles" vehicle in case the first (left-most) digit is 9. (9X-XXX-41)
42-49		Not in use
50	2002-2003	Honda
	2003	All manufacturers
	2006-2005	Daihatsu
51	2003-2004	All manufacturers
52	1982	All manufacturers
	2013-2014	All manufacturers
53	1983	All manufacturers
	2013-2014	All manufacturers
	2015	Champion Motors (Dealer)
54	1984	All manufacturers
	2013-2014	All manufacturers
	2015	Delek Motors (Dealer), Champion Motors (Dealer), Carasso (Dealer)
55	1985	All manufacturers, mostly commercial vehicles
		Re-registration of "collectibles" vehicle in case the first (left-most) digit is 9. (9X-XXX-55)
	2015	Colmobil (Dealer)
56	1986	All manufacturers, mostly commercial vehicles
	2004	All manufacturers
	2005	Champion (Dealer)
57	1987	All manufacturers, mostly commercial vehicles
	2004-2005	All manufacturers
	2005	Re-registration in case the first (left-most) digit is 9. (9X-XXX-57)
	2015	Delek Motors (Dealer)
58	1988	All manufacturers, mostly commercial vehicles
	2005	All manufacturers
	2006	Japanauto (Dealer)
	2014	Automotive Equipment Group (Dealer), Subaru
59	1989	All manufacturers, mostly commercial vehicles
	2005-2006	All manufacturers
	Since 2007	Hamizrach (Dealer)
	2015-2016	Japanauto (Dealer)
60	2006-2007	All manufacturers
	2006	Re-registration in case the first (left-most) digit is 9. (9X-XXX-60)
61	2006-2008	All manufacturers
	2007	Re-registration in case the first (left-most) digit is 9. (9X-XXX-61)
62	2007	All manufacturers
63	2007-2008	All manufacturers
64	2008	All manufacturers
	2013-2014	Peugeot, Citroen
65	2008-2009	All manufacturers
66	2008-2009	All manufacturers
67	2008-2010	All manufacturers
68	2008-2010	All manufacturers
	2009	Re-registration in case the first (left-most) digit is 9. (9X-XXX-68)
69	2009-2010	All manufacturers
	2009-2010	Re-registration in case the first (left-most) digit is 9. (9X-XXX-69)
70	2009-2010	All manufacturers
71	2010-2011	All manufacturers
	2011	Re-registration in case the first (left-most) digit is 9. (9X-XXX-71)
72	2010-2011	All manufacturers
	2011-2012	Re-registration in case the first (left-most) digit is 9. (9X-XXX-72)
73	2010-2011	All manufacturers
	2012-2013	Re-registration in case the first (left-most) digit is 9. (9X-XXX-73)
74	2011	All manufacturers
	2013	Re-registration in case the first (left-most) digit is 9. (9X-XXX-74)
	2014	Peugeot, Citroen
75	2011-2012	All manufacturers
	2013	Subaru, re-registration in case the first (left-most) digit is 9. (9X-XXX-75)
76	2011-2013	All manufacturers
77	1990-2003	Government vehicle. After the vehicle left government service it received re-registration plate
78	2011-2012	All manufacturers
79	2012-2013	All manufacturers
80	1980	All manufacturers
81	1981	All manufacturers
82	1982	All manufacturers
83	1983	All manufacturers
84	1984	All manufacturers
85	1985	All manufacturers
86	1986	All manufacturers
87	1987	All manufacturers
88	1988	All manufacturers
89	1989	All manufacturers
90-99		Not in use

== Vehicle dealers in Israel ==
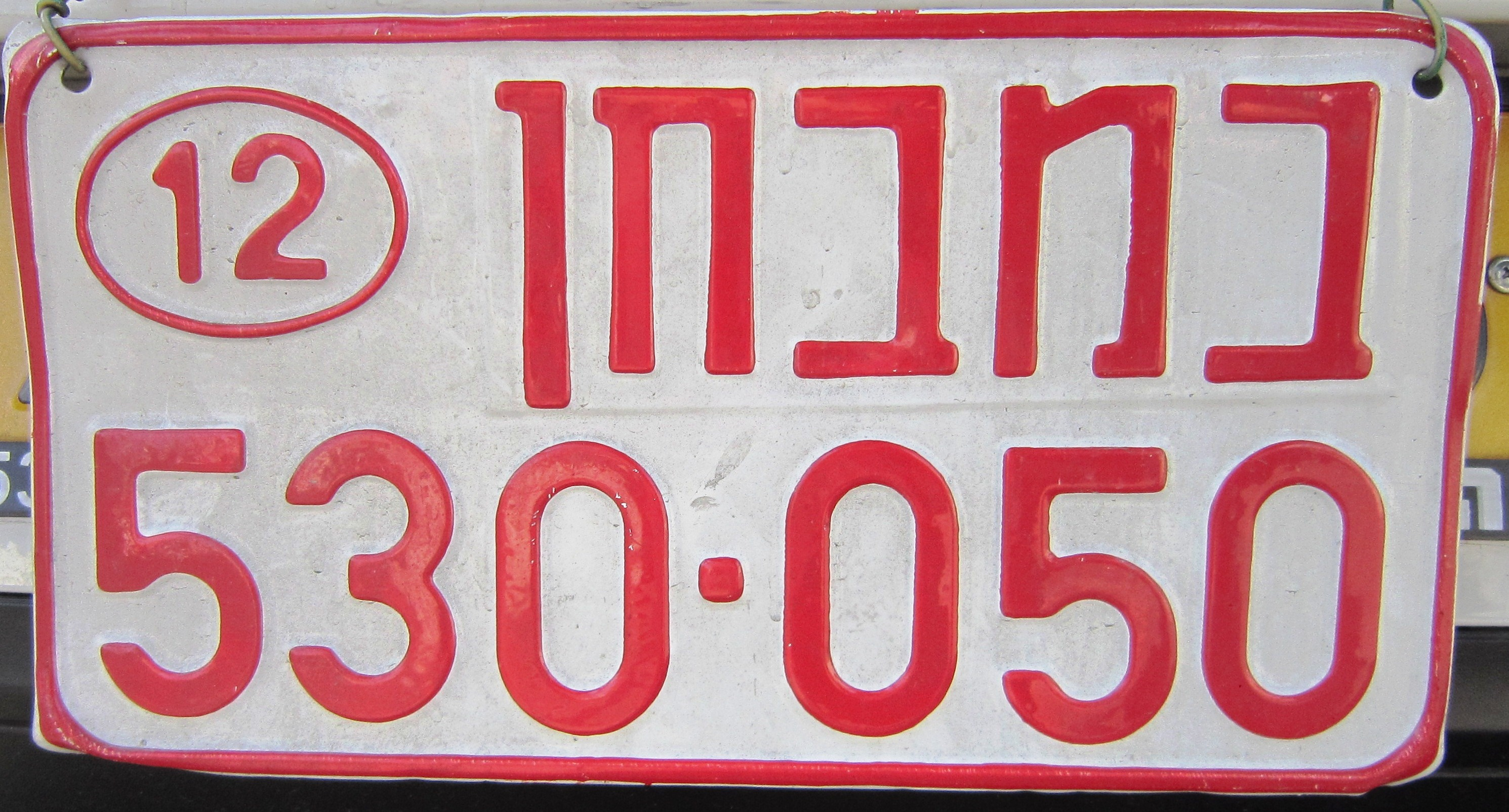
dealer plate

Dealer	Brands
UMI Universal Motors Israel	Chevrolet, Buick, Cadillac, Isuzu, Pontiac, Oldsmobile, GMC, Saab; Opel (until 2011)
Delek Motors	Mazda, Ford, BMW; Mini (since 2011)
Kamor	Until 2011 Kamor imported BMW and Mini.
Lubinsky	Peugeot, Citroen; MG (since 2011), Opel (since 2017)
Champion Motors	Audi, Volkswagen, Seat, Skoda; BYD (co-op with Shlomo-Sixt)
Carasso Motors	Renault, Nissan, Infiniti, Dacia, Chery; EVeasy (JMEV)
Union Motors	Toyota, Lexus, GAC, Geely
Meir	Honda, Volvo, Polestar, Lynk&Co
Samlat - Cars Agency for the Mediterranean	Ferrari, Maserati, Fiat, Alfa Romeo, Subaru (since 2013), RAM (Since 2016), Lancia, Abarth, Chrysler/Jeep (since 2016), Dodge (since 2016), Kia (until 2008), Hongqi
Telcar	Daihatsu, Ssangyong; Kia (since 2008), Seres
Colmobil	Mitsubishi, Hyundai, Mercedes, Smart; Great Wall (since 2022)
Hamizrach	Land Rover, Jaguar; Great Wall (2010–2015)
Automotive Equipment Group	Suzuki, Chrysler/Jeep/Dodge (until 2016), Porsche
Shlomo-Sixt	Opel (until 2017); BYD (co-op with Champion Motors)
Japanauto	Subaru (until 2013, bought in 2013 by Samlat)
Tesla Israel	Tesla
Belilios Group	Aiways
China Motors	Maxus
EV Motors	JAC, LEVC, WM Motor/Weltmeister
Caduri Group	Skywell/Skyworth, Zhidou
Metro Motor	Leapmotor, Karma, Voyah

== Regulations ==
Regulations no. 300-301 state that every vehicle registered in Israel must carry two registration plates, installed on the front and rear ends of the vehicle (one on each) in the designated places by the manufacturer, or otherwise determined by the licensing authority. Motorcycles, trailers, semi-trailers, bicycles and tricycles must carry one plate only, installed on the rear end.

Registration plates must always be clean and must not be obscured by freight.

A damaged or vandalized registration plate must be replaced with a new one.

It is prohibited to remove a plate except for its replacement. It is also prohibited to add details to a plate, change its color or blur it.

A vehicle registered in Israel is allowed to carry Israeli plates only.

A registration plate in a motor vehicle must be illuminated, so it can be read from a distance of 20 meters (66 feet) in daylight and fair weather.

== Electronic toll collection ==
When driving on an electronic toll collection route in Israel like Highway 6, the vehicle registration plate is electro-optically read at the entrance and exit from the route. Later, a clerk will manually enter the data into the database and subsequently, an invoice is sent to the address of the owner of the vehicle, as it is registered in the database of the Ministry of Transportation.

== See also ==
- Vehicle registration plates of Palestine
- List of international vehicle registration codes
- Electronic toll collection
