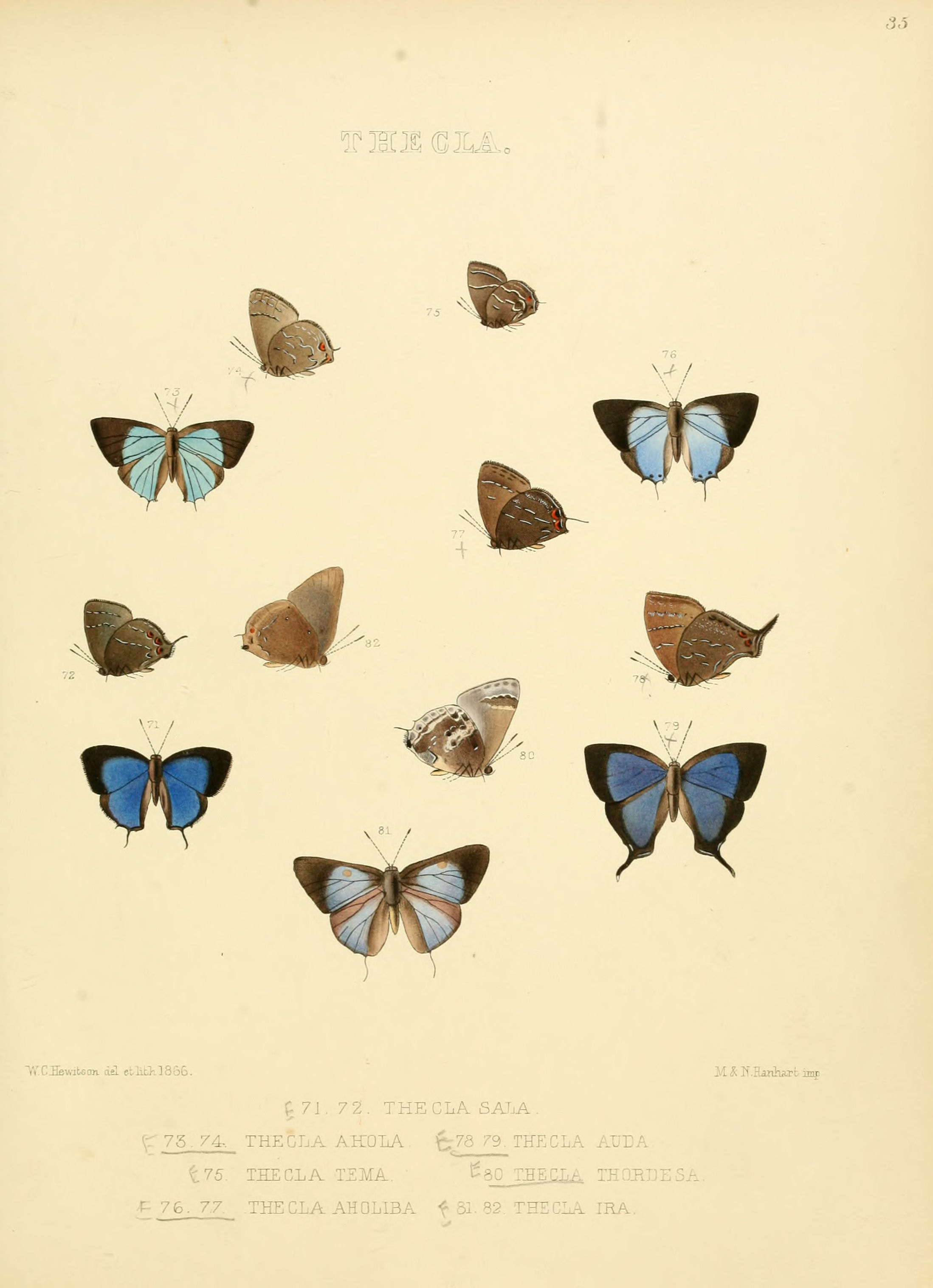
- Johnsonita auda and other Lycaenidae

Scientific classification
- Kingdom: Animalia
- Phylum: Arthropoda
- Class: Insecta
- Order: Lepidoptera
- Family: Lycaenidae
- Tribe: Eumaeini
- Genus: Johnsonita; Salazar & Constantino, 1995

Synonyms
- Owda Johnson, Kruse & Kroenlein, 1997

= Johnsonita =

Butterfly genus in family Lycaenidae

Johnsonita is a genus of butterflies in the family Lycaenidae. The species of this genus are found in the Neotropical realm.

== Species ==
- Johnsonita assula (Draudt, 1919)
- Johnsonita auda (Hewitson, 1867)
- Johnsonita catadupa (Hewitson, 1869)
- Johnsonita chlamydem (Druce, 1907)
- Johnsonita johnbanksi Bálint, 2003
- Johnsonita johnsoni Salazar & Constantino, 1995
- Johnsonita pardoa (D'Abrera, 1995)
- Johnsonita spp. – 11 undescribed
