= Owdeh =

Owdeh عوده
- Village
- Location within Iran
- Coordinates: 31°16′52″N 49°07′52″E
- Country: Iran
- Province: Khuzestan
- County: Ahvaz
- Bakhsh: Central
- Rural District: Gheyzaniyeh

Population (2006)
  - Total: 1,220
- Time zone: UTC+3:30 (IRST)
  - Summer (DST): UTC+4:30 (IRDT)

Owdeh (Persian: عوده, also Romanized as ‘Owdeh and ‘Ūdeh; also known as Uwda) is a village in Gheyzaniyeh Rural District, in the Central District of Ahvaz County, Khuzestan Province, Iran. At the 2006 census, its population was 1,220, in 234 families.
