= Economy of Kuwait =

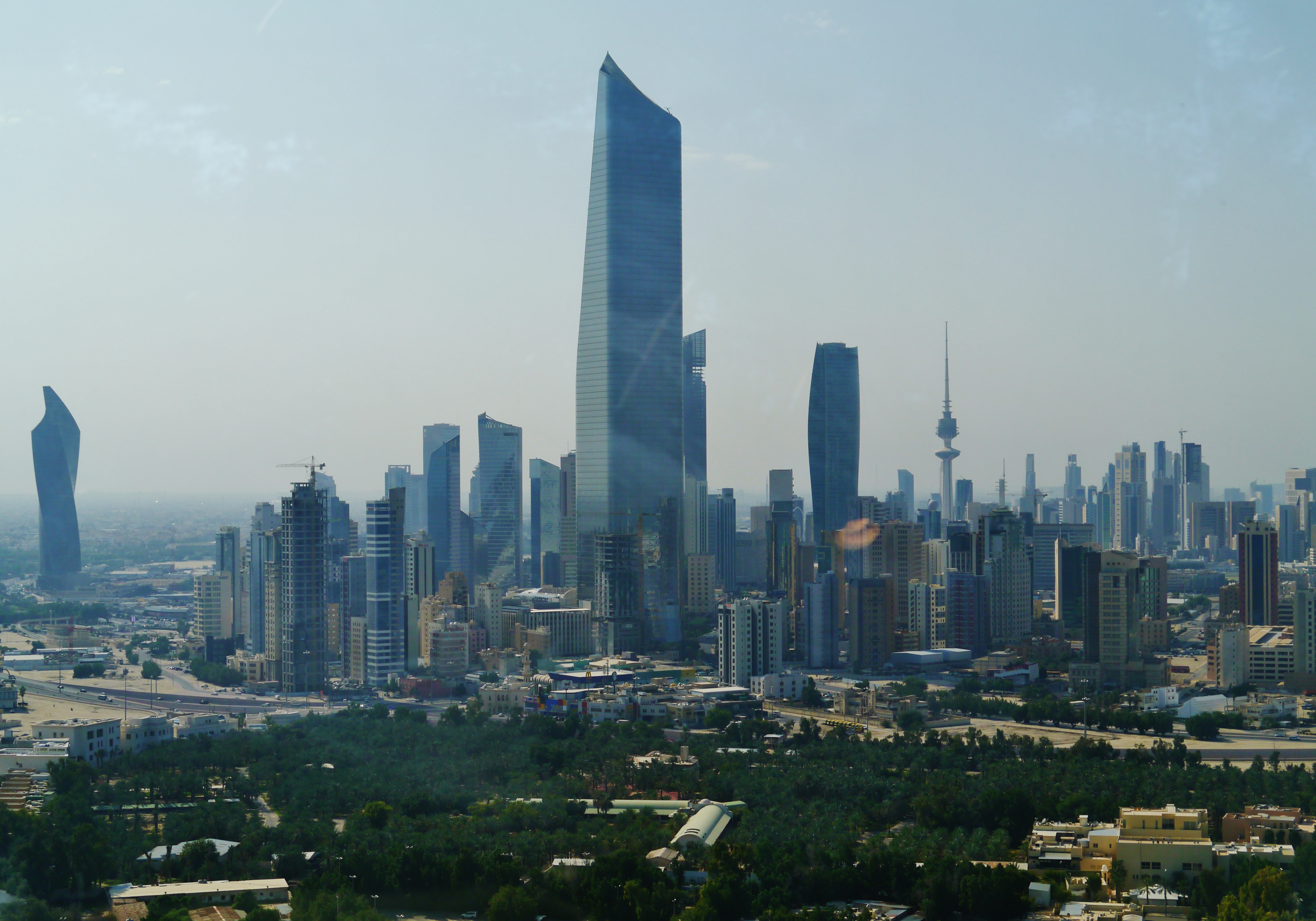
- Kuwait City skyline
- Currency: Kuwaiti dinar (KWD)
- Fiscal year: 1 April – 31 March
- Trade organisations: WTO, OPEC and GCC
- Country group: Developing/Emerging; High-income economy

Statistics
- Population: ▲4,853,420 (2023)
- GDP: ▲$172.92 billion (nominal, 2026 est); ▲$283.13 billion (PPP, 2024 est.)
- GDP rank: 59th (nominal, 2026); 73nd (PPP, 2026)
- GDP growth: ▲3.5% (2025); ▼ -0.6% (2026e); ▲3.8% (2027f)
- GDP per capita: ▲$33,164 (nominal, 2026 est.); ▲$54,303 (PPP, 2026 est.)
- GDP per capita rank: 43th (nominal, 2026); 41th (PPP, 2026)
- GDP per capita growth: -3.4% (2024)
- GDP by sector: agriculture (0.4%), industry (67%), services (43.6%) (2022 est.)
- Inflation (CPI): ▼3.8% (2026)
- Human Development Index: ▲0.847 very high (2022) (49th); N/A IHDI (2022)
- Unemployment: ▼2.1%
- Youth unemployment: 15.1% (2025)
- Main industries: petroleum, petrochemicals, steelmaking, cement, shipbuilding and repair, desalination, food processing, construction materials

External
- Exports: $95.476 billion (2023 est.)
- Export goods: oil and refined products, acyclic alcohols, motor cars and other motor vehicles, lightvessels, floating cranes, floating docks, dredgers
- Main export partners: China 24% India 15% South Korea 11% Japan 9% Taiwan 7% (2022 est.)
- Imports: $63.43 billion (2023 est.)
- Import goods: food, construction materials, vehicles and parts, clothing
- Main import partners: UAE 20% China 16% Saudi Arabia 9% US 7% Japan 4% (2022 est.)
- Gross external debt: ▲$48.91 billion (31 December 2017 est.)

Public finance
- Government debt: ▲$13.74 billion (2021 est.)
- Revenue: $24.97 billion (2020 est.)
- Spending: $71.58 billion (2020 est.)
- Economic aid: N/A
- Credit rating: S&P Global Ratings: AA- (Domestic); AA- (Foreign); AA+ (T&C Assessment); Outlook: Stable; Moody's: Aa2; Outlook: Stable; Fitch: AA; Outlook: Stable
- All values, unless otherwise stated, are in US dollars.

Kuwait has a petroleum-based economy that is classified as emerging and high-income. By various per-capita measures of economic output, Kuwait is one of the wealthiest countries in the world. Kuwait advocates since its independence for a state-led capitalist economy system.

== History ==
In the early 18th century, Kuwait's economy was centered around maritime trade, dhow building, and the lucrative pearling industry. Kuwait's geographic position on the Arabian Gulf made it a vital stop for transiting Bedouin caravan routes and a trade hub for regional merchants.

The economic turning point occurred in 1934 when Kuwait granted an oil concession to the Kuwait Oil Company (KOC), a joint venture between BP and Gulf Oil, followed by the discovery of oil in 1938 at the Burgan field, though commercial production was delayed until 1946.

Following independence in 1961, Kuwait emerged as the financial and cultural capital of the Gulf. In 1974, the state began acquiring ownership of KOC, eventually taking full control over its oil and gas resources, which ranked among the largest in the world. In 1982, the collapse of Kuwait's unofficial stock market wiped out billions of dollars and severely disrupted the domestic financial sector.

The 1990-1991 Iraqi invasion and the Gulf War severely damaged Kuwait's infrastructure and paralyzed its economy, but it soon recovered within two to three years, primarily driven by the rapid capping of hundreds of burning oil wells and the restoration of crude exports, with pre-war oil production capacities largely restored by early 1993. The massive costs of rebuilding destroyed infrastructure and international coalition forces stationed in the country forced Kuwait to take on foreign loans that drained its sovereign wealth funds and created temporary fiscal deficits.

In the 21st century, hydrocarbons accounts for approximately 60% of the GDP and 90% of export revenues. To mitigate extreme cyclicality and reduce energy dependence, the government launched Kuwait Vision 2035, a strategic initiative aimed at structural diversification, attracting foreign direct investment and developing non-oil sectors like logistics, technology, and finance.

== Sectors ==
=== Petroleum and natural gas ===
In 1934, the Emir of Kuwait granted an oil concession to the Kuwait Oil Company (KOC), jointly owned by the Anglo-Persian Oil Company and Gulf Oil Corporation. In 1976, the Kuwaiti Government nationalized KOC.

The Kuwait Petroleum Corporation (KPC), an integrated international oil company, is the parent company of the government's operations in the petroleum sector, and includes Kuwait Oil Company, which produced oil and gas; Kuwait National Petroleum Company, which handled refining at Mina Al-Ahmadi and domestic sales; Petrochemical Industries Co., producing ammonia and urea; Kuwait Foreign Petroleum Exploration Company, with several concessions in developing countries; Kuwait Oil Tanker Co.; and Santa Fe International Corp. The latter, purchased outright in 1982, gives KPC a worldwide presence in the petroleum industry.

KPC also has purchased from Gulf Oil Co. refineries and associated service stations in the Benelux nations and Scandinavia, as well as storage facilities and a network of service stations in Italy. In 1987, KPC bought a 19% share in British Petroleum, which was later reduced to 10%. KPC markets its products in Europe under the brand Q8 and is interested in the markets of the United States and Japan.

Kuwait has about 94 billion barrels (14.9 km^{3}) of recoverable oil reserves. Estimated capacity, before the war, was about 2.4 million barrels per day (380×10^{3} m^{3}/d). During the Iraqi occupation, Kuwait's oil-producing capacity was reduced to practically nothing. However, tremendous recovery and improvements have been made since. Oil production was 1.5 million barrels per day (240×10^{3} m^{3}/d) by the end of 1992, and pre-war capacity was restored in 1993.

As part of Kuwait Vision 2035, Kuwait aims to position itself as a global hub for the petrochemical industry. Al Zour Refinery is the largest refinery in the Middle East. Al Zour Refinery is a Kuwait-China cooperation project under the Belt and Road Initiative.

Kuwait is a founding member of the OPEC cartel.

=== Steel manufacturing ===
Steel manufacturing is Kuwait's second biggest industry. United Steel Industrial Company (KWT Steel) is Kuwait's main steel manufacturing company, the company caters to all of Kuwait's domestic market demands (particularly construction). Kuwait is self-sufficient in steel.

=== Agriculture ===
In 2016, Kuwait's food self-sufficiency ratio was 49.5% in vegetables, 38.7% in meat, 12.4% in dairy, 24.9% in fruits, and 0.4% in cereals. 8.5% of Kuwait's entire territory consists of agricultural land, while arable land covers 0.6% of Kuwait's entire territory. Historically, Jahra was a predominantly agricultural area. There are currently various farms in Jahra.

In 2017, agriculture (including fisheries) accounted for almost 0.4 percent of the gross domestic product. Around 4 percent of the economically active population works in agriculture, almost all foreigners. The majority of farm owners are investors. The total agricultural land covered 1,521 km^{2} in 2014.

The agriculture industry is hampered by the limited water and arable land. The government has experimented in growing food through hydroponics and carefully managed farms. However, most of the soil which was suitable for farming in south central Kuwait was destroyed when Iraqi troops set fire to oil wells in the area and created vast "oil lakes". Fish and shrimp are plentiful in territorial waters, and largescale commercial fishing has been undertaken locally and in the Indian Ocean.

=== Finance and banking ===
Kuwait has a leading position in the financial industry in the GCC. The Emir has promoted the idea that Kuwait should focus its energies, in terms of economic development, on the financial industry.

The historical preeminence of Kuwait (among the Gulf monarchies) in finance dates back to the founding of the National Bank of Kuwait in 1952. The bank was the first local publicly traded corporation in the Gulf. In the late 1970s and early 1980s, an alternative stock market, trading in shares of Gulf companies, emerged in Kuwait, the Souk Al-Manakh. At its peak, its market capitalization was the third highest in the world, behind only the United States and Japan, and ahead of the United Kingdom and France.

Kuwait has a large wealth-management industry. Kuwaiti investment companies administer more assets than those of any other GCC country, save the much larger Saudi Arabia. The Kuwait Financial Centre, in a rough calculation, estimated that Kuwaiti firms accounted for over one-third of the total assets under management in the GCC.

The relative strength of Kuwait in the financial industry extends to its stock market. For many years, the total valuation of all companies listed on the Kuwaiti exchange far exceeded the value of those on any other GCC bourse, except Saudi Arabia. In 2011, financial and banking companies made up more than half of the market capitalization of the Kuwaiti bourse; among all the Gulf states, the market capitalization of Kuwaiti financial-sector firms was, in total, behind only that of Saudi Arabia. In recent years, Kuwaiti investment companies have invested large percentages of their assets abroad, and their foreign assets have become substantially larger than their domestic assets.

Kuwait is a major source of foreign economic assistance to other states through the Kuwait Fund for Arab Economic Development, an autonomous state institution created in 1961 on the pattern of Western and international development agencies. Over the years aid was annually provided to Egypt, Syria, and Jordan, as well as the Palestine Liberation Organization. In 1974, the fund's lending mandate was expanded to include all developing countries in the world.

==== Reserve funds ====
The Kuwait Investment Authority (KIA) is Kuwait's sovereign wealth fund specializing in foreign investment. The KIA is the world's oldest sovereign wealth fund. Since 1953, the Kuwaiti government has directed investments into Europe, the United States and the Asia–Pacific. In 2021, the holdings were valued at around $700 billion in assets. It was the 3rd largest sovereign wealth fund in the world.

The KIA manages two funds: the General Reserve Fund (GRF) and Future Generations Fund (FGF). The GRF is the main treasurer for the government. It receives all state revenues and all national expenditures are paid out of this fund. The KIA does not disclose its financial assets in public, but it is estimated that the KIA has $410 billion in assets as of February 2014.

The KIA was the main source of capital for the Kuwaiti government during the Gulf War. The Kuwaiti government relied on the KIA to pay for coalition expenses and postwar reconstruction. The KIA was worth $100 billion prior to 1990, KIA funds were depleted to $40–$50 billion after the Gulf War.

In July 2023, Kuwait plans to create a new sovereign fund, Ciyada, in partnership with the Kuwait Investment Authority (KIA). While the value of the fund has not been specified, the KIA, which currently manages over $800 billion in assets, will play a significant role in studying and implementing the proposed fund. The aim is to develop the local economy, attract foreign investment, and finance major projects to promote economic diversification in Kuwait.

Future Generations Fund

The Future Generations Fund (FGF) was created in 1976 by transferring 50% from the general reserve fund at that time. The FGF is a saving funds for future generations. 25% of all state revenues are annually transferred to the fund.

All of the FGF is invested abroad, with an estimated 75% invested in the US and Europe and the rest in emerging markets, mainly China and India.

=== Real estate and housing ===
Kuwait's real estate market features a mix of government-backed housing authorities and publicly traded real estate firms. The Public Authority for Housing Welfare (PAHW) handles the massive state housing distribution programs. Notable private-sector developers and investment firms include the Kuwait Real Estate Company, which are involved in commercial and mixed-use infrastructure.

=== Tourism ===
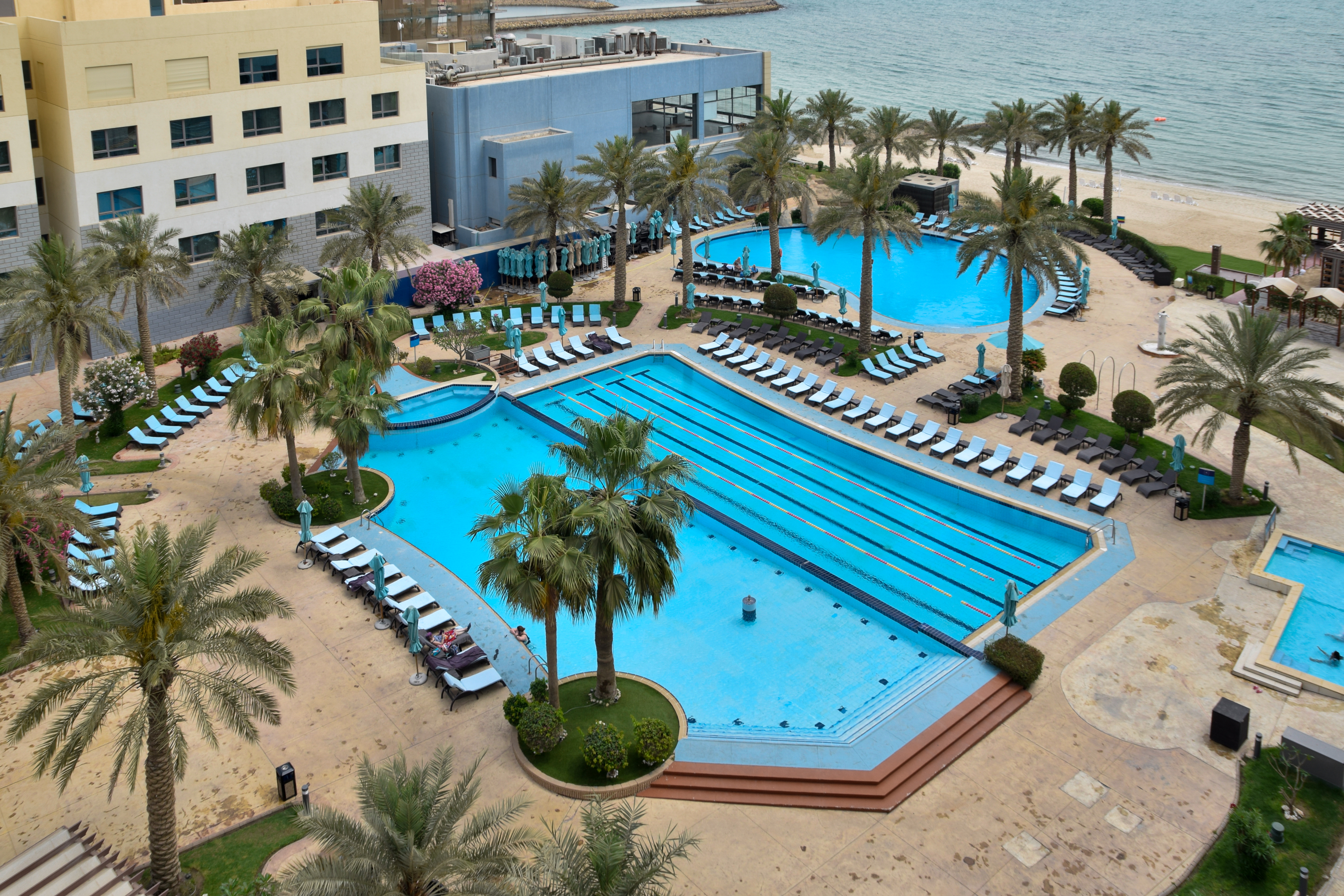
The Palms Beach Hotel & Spa in Kuwait

In 2020, Kuwait's domestic travel and tourism spending reached $6.1 billion (up from $1.6 billion in 2019) with family tourism a rapidly growing segment. The WTTC named Kuwait as one of the world's fastest-growing countries in travel and tourism GDP in 2019, with 11.6% year-on-year growth. In 2016, the tourism industry generated nearly $500 million in revenue. In 2015, tourism accounted for 1.5 percent of the GDP.

In 2023, there was a rise in the spending of Kuwaiti citizens on tourism and travel, recorded to be 4.39 billion dinars, marking an increase of 9.2% from the 4 billion dinars recorded in 2022. The surge in tourism expenditures is largely attributable to the introduction of new travel destinations, expanded offerings from airlines catering to family travel, and an increase in interest in events like the Riyadh Season and other festivities. The first quarter of 2023 saw the highest spending (1.36 billion dinars), followed by the second (1.01 billion dinars), third (1.15 billion dinars), and the fourth (870 million dinars), making it the year with the highest spending on travel by Kuwaiti citizens since the outbreak of the COVID-19 pandemic. Moreover, spending by foreign tourists in Kuwait increased by approximately 60%, reaching 533.3 million dinars by the end of 2023, up from 332.6 million dinars in 2022.

The Amiri Diwan recently inaugurated the new Kuwait National Cultural District (KNCD), which comprises Sheikh Abdullah Al Salem Cultural Centre, Sheikh Jaber Al Ahmad Cultural Centre, Al Shaheed Park, and Al Salam Palace. With a capital cost of more than US$1 billion, the project is one of the largest cultural investments in the world. In November 2016, the Sheikh Jaber Al Ahmad Cultural Centre opened. It is the largest cultural centre and opera house in the Middle East. The Kuwait National Cultural District is a member of the Global Cultural Districts Network. The annual "Hala Febrayer" festival attracts tourists from neighboring GCC countries, and includes a variety of events including music concerts, parades, and carnivals. The festival is a month-long commemoration of the liberation of Kuwait, and runs from 1 to 28 February. Liberation Day itself is celebrated on 26 February.

=== Science and technology ===
According to the United States Patent and Trademark Office, Kuwait registered 448 patents as of 31 December 2015, In the early to mid 2010s, Kuwait registered the largest number of scientific publications and patents per capita regionally. The Kuwaiti government has implemented various programs to foster innovation resulting in patent rights. In 2025, the WIPO Global Innovation Index, which ranks economies according to their innovation capabilities, ranked Kuwait 73rd out of 139 economies.

Kuwait was the first country in the region to implement 5G technology. Kuwait is among the world's leading countries in 5G penetration. The Chinese company Huawei has a $1.7 billion investment license in Kuwait to develop the country's ICT sector in line with the Kuwait Vision 2035 strategy.

=== Space ===
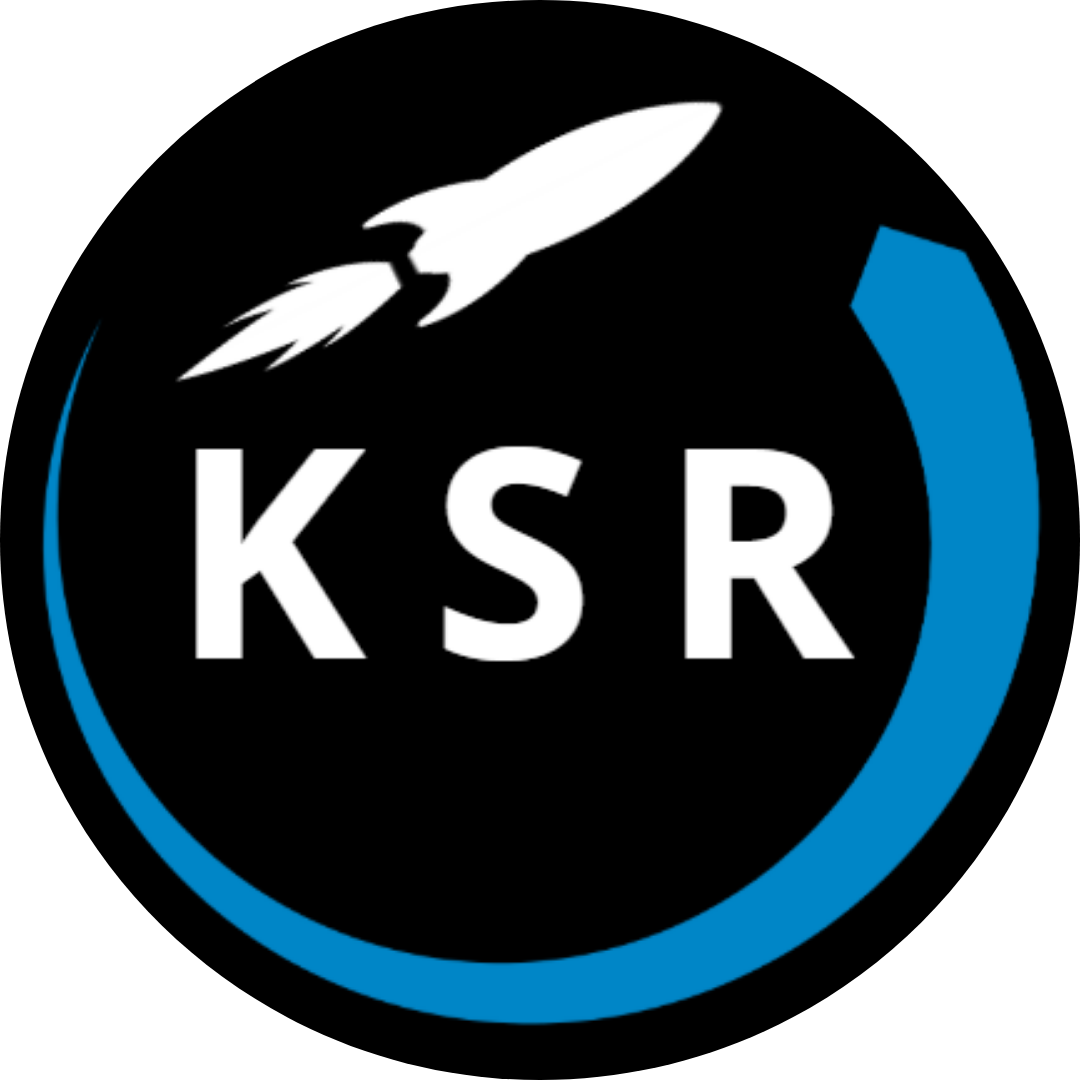
Kuwait Space Rocket

Kuwait has an emerging space industry driven by the private sector.

Kuwait's first satellite

Kuwait's Orbital Space in collaboration with the Space Challenges Program and EnduroSat introduced an international initiative called "Code in Space". The initiative allows students from around the world to send and execute their own code in space. The code is transmitted from a satellite ground station to a cubesat (nanosatellite) orbiting Earth 500 km (310 mi) above sea level. The code is then executed by the satellite's onboard computer and tested under real space environment conditions. The nanosatellite is called "QMR-KWT" (Arabic: قمر الكويت) which means "Moon of Kuwait", translated from Arabic.

QMR-KWT launched to space on 30 June 2021 on SpaceX Falcon 9 Block 5 rocket and was part of the payload of a satellite carrier called ION SCV Dauntless David by D-Orbit. It was deployed into its final orbit (Sun-synchronous orbit) on 16 July 2021. QMR-KWT is Kuwait's first satellite.

Um Alaish 4

Seven years after the launch of the world's first communications satellite, Telstar 1, Kuwait in October 1969 inaugurated the first satellite ground station in the Middle East, "Um Alaish". The Um Alaish satellite station complex housed several satellite ground stations including Um Alaish 1 (1969), Um Alaish 2 (1977), and Um Alaish 3 (1981). It provided satellite communication services in Kuwait until 1990 when it was destroyed by the Iraqi armed forces during the Iraqi invasion of Kuwait. In 2019, Kuwait's Orbital Space established an amateur satellite ground station to provide free access to signals from satellites in orbit passing over Kuwait. The station was named Um Alaish 4 to continue the legacy of "Um Alaish" satellite station. Um Alaish 4 is member of FUNcube distributed ground station network and the Satellite Networked Open Ground Station project (SatNOGS).

Kuwait Space Rocket

The Kuwait Space Rocket (KSR) is a Kuwaiti project to build and launch the first suborbital liquid bi-propellant rocket in Arabia. The project is divided into two phases with two separate vehicles: an initial testing phase with KSR-1 as a test vehicle capable of reaching an altitude of 8 km (5.0 mi) and a more expansive suborbital test phase with the KSR-2 planned to fly to an altitude of 100 km (62 mi).

TSCK experiment in space

Kuwait's Orbital Space in collaboration with the Kuwait Scientific Center (TSCK) introduced for the first time in Kuwait the opportunity for students to send a science experiment to space. The objectives of this initiative was to allow students to learn about (a) how science space missions are done; (b) microgravity (weightlessness) environment; (c) how to do science like a real scientist. This opportunity was made possible through Orbital Space agreement with DreamUp PBC and Nanoracks LLC, which are collaborating with NASA under a Space Act Agreement. The students' experiment was named "Kuwait’s Experiment: E.coli Consuming Carbon Dioxide to Combat Climate Change". The experiment was launched on SpaceX CRS-21 (SpX-21) spaceflight to the International Space Station (ISS) on 6 December 2020. Astronauts Shannon Walker (member of the ISS Expedition 64) conducted the experiment on behalf of the students.

National satellite project

In July 2021, Kuwait University announced that it is launching a national satellite project as part of state-led efforts to pioneer the country's sustainable space sector.

=== Education ===
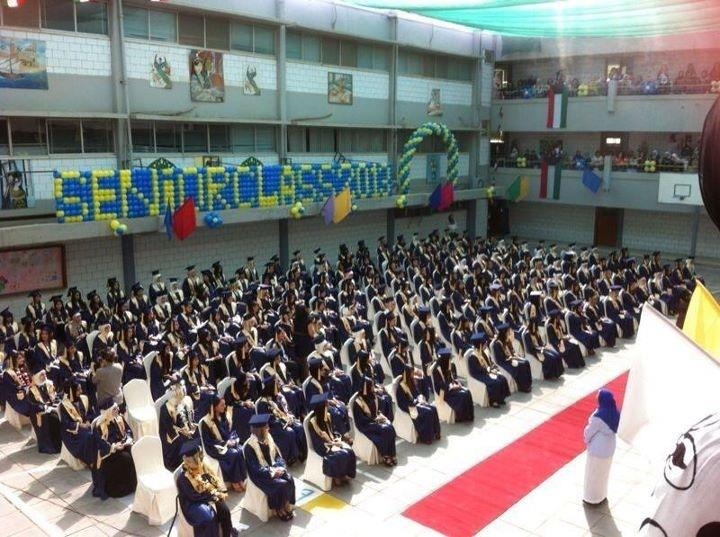
Fajer Al-sabah School 2013 graduation

The State of Kuwait, located at the head of the Persian Gulf, supports an educational policy that seeks to provide an opportunity to all children, irrespective of their social class, including children with special needs. Kuwait was ranked 63rd on the Human Development Index report for 2011 by the United Nations Development Programme, placing Kuwait above the regional average.

According to 2017 data from UNESCO, the literacy rate stood at 96.3% for Kuwaitis aged 25–64, compared to 80% across the MENA region. In 2017 99.9% of Kuwaitis aged, 15–24 were literate, while the MENA average was 89.6% in 2016. Moreover, according to World Bank statistics from 2015, among Kuwaitis 15 and older, females have caught up to and surpassed their male peers on this metric of educational attainment, which stands, for the respective sexes, at 99.4% and 96.4%.

The education system in Kuwait has celebrated numerous achievements on a global scale; in the year ending 2006, thirteen percent of all public expenditure was given to education, comparable to many OECD countries. As a percentage of GDP, at 15 percent, Kuwait is currently above the OECD average.

Kuwait has the highest literacy rate in the Arab world. In 2005, the literacy rate of Kuwait was 94 percent. The Ministry of Education is also making efforts to incorporate women into the educated workforce through various programs; for instance, the 1989 initiative to establish daytime literacy clinics for women. The Kuwaiti government offers scholarships to students who are accepted in universities in the United States, the United Kingdom and other foreign academic institutions.

=== Healthcare ===
Kuwait has a state-funded healthcare system, which provides treatment without charge to Kuwaiti nationals. There are outpatient clinics in every residential area in Kuwait. A public insurance scheme exists to provide reduced cost healthcare to expatriates. Private healthcare providers also run medical facilities in the country, available to members of their insurance schemes. As part of Kuwait Vision 2035, many new hospitals have opened. In the years leading up to the COVID-19 pandemic, Kuwait invested in its health care system at a rate that was proportionally higher than most other GCC countries. As a result, the public hospital sector significantly increased its capacity. Kuwait currently has 20 public hospitals. The new Sheikh Jaber Al-Ahmad Hospital is considered the largest hospital in the Middle East. Kuwait also has 16 private hospitals.

== Infrastructure ==
=== Electricity ===
==== Renewable energy ====
As part of Kuwait Vision 2035, Kuwait inaugurated its largest renewable energy park, Shagaya Renewable Energy Park, which includes concentrated solar power, solar photovoltaic, and wind power plants. The park consists of four phases with a target capacity of 4,000 MW. It is set to be one of the largest renewable energy parks in the world.

=== Transport ===
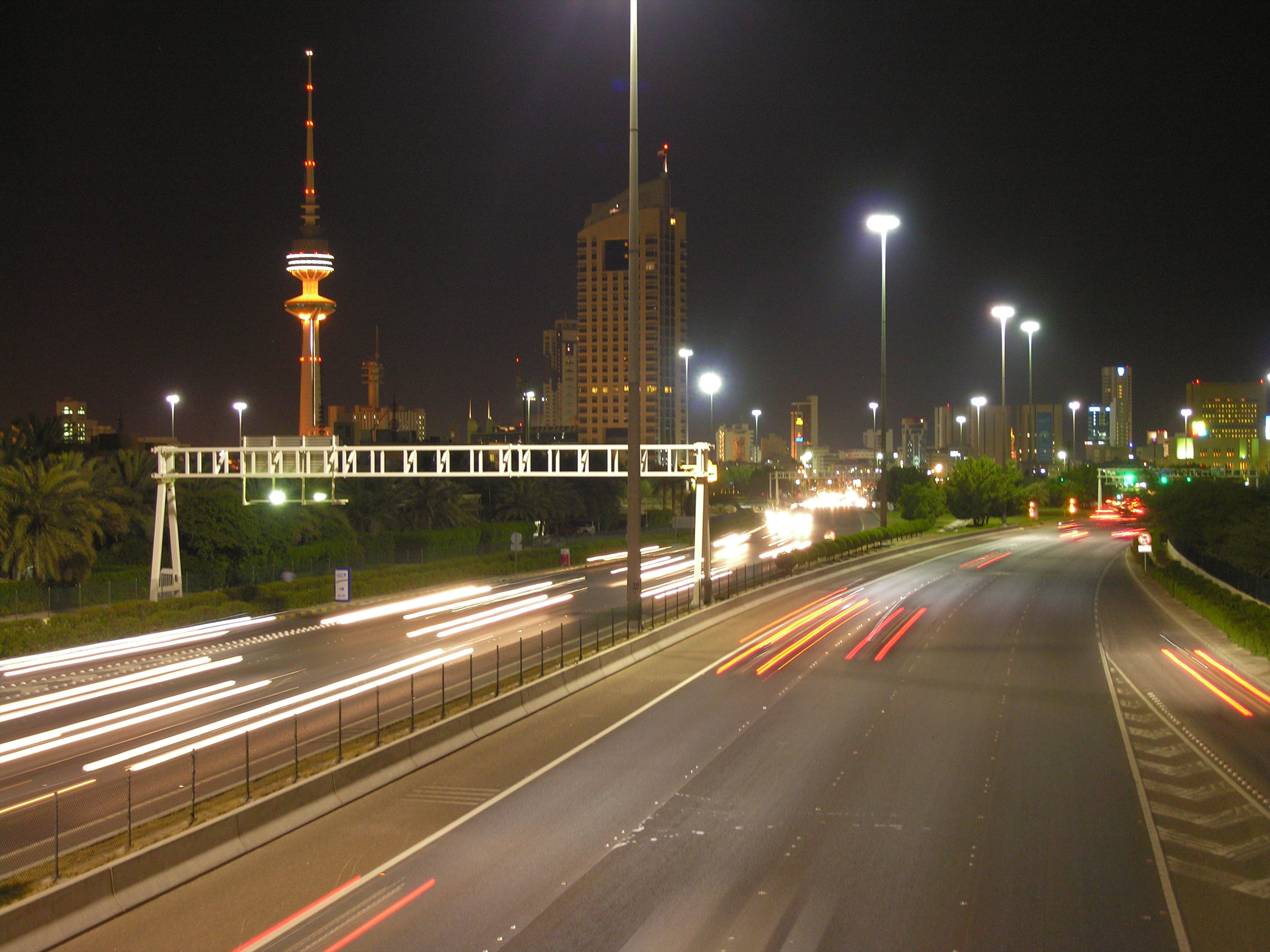
A highway in Kuwait City

Kuwait has a modern network of highways. Roadways extended 5,749 km (3,572 mi), of which 4,887 km (3,037 mi) is paved. There are more than 2 million passenger cars, and 500,000 commercial taxis, buses, and trucks in use. On major highways the maximum speed is 120 km/h (75 mph). Since there is no railway system in the country, most people travel by automobiles.

The country's public transportation network consists almost entirely of bus routes. The state owned Kuwait Public Transportation Company was established in 1962. It runs local bus routes across Kuwait as well as longer distance services to other Gulf states. The main private bus company is CityBus, which operates about 20 routes across the country. Another private bus company, Kuwait Gulf Link Public Transport Services, was started in 2006. It runs local bus routes across Kuwait and longer distance services to neighbouring Arab countries.

There are two airports in Kuwait. Kuwait International Airport serves as the principal hub for international air travel. State-owned Kuwait Airways is the largest airline in the country. A portion of the airport complex is designated as Al Mubarak Air Base, which contains the headquarters of the Kuwait Air Force, as well as the Kuwait Air Force Museum. In 2004, the first private airline of Kuwait, Jazeera Airways, was launched. In 2005, the second private airline, Wataniya Airways was founded.

Kuwait has one of the largest shipping industries in the region. The Kuwait Ports Public Authority manages and operates ports across Kuwait. The country's principal commercial seaports are Shuwaikh port and Shuaiba port which handled combined cargo of 753,334 TEU in 2006. Mina Al-Ahmadi, the largest port in the country, handles most of Kuwait's oil exports. Mubarak Al Kabeer Port in Bubiyan Island is currently under construction. The port is expected to handle 2 million TEU when operations start.

== Entrepreneurship ==
In the past five years, there has been a significant rise in entrepreneurship and small business creation in Kuwait. The informal sector is also on the rise, mainly due to the popularity of Instagram businesses. In 2020, Kuwait ranked fourth in the MENA region in startup funding after the UAE, Egypt and Saudi Arabia.

Many Kuwaiti entrepreneurs use the Instagram-based business model.

== Macroeconomics ==
Exports of Kuwait by product category (2019) Chemical products Transportation Machines Mineral products Plastics and rubbers Metals Foodstuffs Precious metals Textiles Instruments Animal products Vegetable products Paper goods Footwear and headwear Miscellaneous Stone and glass Wood products Animal and vegetable bi-products Animal hides Arts and antiques Weapons

The following table shows the main economic indicators in 1995–2024.

Year	GDP (in billion US$ PPP)	GDP per capita (in US$ PPP)	GDP (in billion US$ nominal)	GDP per capita (in US$ nominal)	GDP growth (real)	Gov. debt (Percentage of GDP)
1995	64.3	35,659	27.2	15,088	▲1.7%	▲34.9%
1996	▲65.8	▼34,744	▲31.5	▲16,623	0.6%	▼26.5%
1997	▲68.6	▼34,663	▼30.4	▲15,330	2.5%	▼24.3%
1998	▲71.9	▲35,484	▼25.9	▲12,797	3.7%	▲25.6%
1999	▼71.6	▼33,999	▲30.1	▲14,297	−1.8%	▼25.5%
2000	▲76.7	▲35,873	▲37.7	▲17,639	4.7%	▼21.4%
2001	▲78.6	▲36,010	▼34.9	▲15,993	0.2%	▲23.0%
2002	▲82.2	▲36,350	▲38.1	▲16,857	3.0%	▼21.3%
2003	▲98.4	▲42,303	▲47.9	▲20,585	17.3%	▼17.2%
2004	▲111.4	▲46,584	▲59.4	▲24,864	10.2%	▼13.9%
2005	▲127.0	▲56,588	▲80.8	▲35,991	10.6%	▼10.2%
2006	▲140.8	▲60,477	▲101.5	▲43,618	7.5%	▼7.8%
2007	▲153.3	▲63,579	▲114.6	▲47,539	6.0%	▼7.0%
2008	▲160.1	▼57,636	▲147.4	▲53,059	2.5%	▼5.4%
2009	▼149.7	▼53,888	▼106.0	▲38,156	−7.1%	▲6.7%
2010	▼147.9	▼50,429	▲115.4	▲39,342	−2.4%	▼6.2%
2011	▲165.5	▲50,979	▲154.0	▲47,440	9.6%	▼4.6%
2012	▲179.8	▲52,446	▲174.1	▲50,784	6.6%	▼3.6%
2013	▲184.9	▼51,538	▲174.2	▲48,544	1.1%	▼3.1%
2014	▲189.1	▼50,508	▼162.7	▲43,459	0.5%	▲3.4%
2015	▲192.0	▼48,904	▼114.6	▲29,195	0.6%	▲4.6%
2016	▲199.5	▼48,857	▼109.4	▲26,796	2.9%	▲9.9%
2017	▼193.5	▼45,771	▲120.7	▲28,552	−4.7%	▲19.6%
2018	▲222.1	▲50,248	▲138.7	▲31,369	2.7%	▼14.3%
2019	▲225.2	▲50,451	▲140.9	▲31,550	2.3%	▼10.5%
2020	▼182.4	▼42,076	▼111.0	▲25,611	−4.8%	▼10.2
2021	▲221.0	▲52,420	▲148.5	▲35,205	2.3%	▼7.2%
2022	▲250.7	▼52,296	▲184.0	▲38,380	5.9%	▼2.9%
2023	▼250.2	▼50,933	▼163.7	▲33,321	−3.6%	▲3.2%
2024	▼249.3	▼49,736	▼161.8	▲32,290	−2.7%	▲7.2%

In 2019, Kuwait's main export products were mineral fuels including oil (89.1% of total exports), aircraft and spacecraft (4.3%), organic chemicals (3.2%), plastics (1.2%), iron and steel (0.2%), gems and precious metals (0.1%), machinery including computers (0.1%), aluminum (0.1%), copper (0.1%), and salt, sulphur, stone and cement (0.1%). Kuwait was the world's biggest exporter of sulfonated, nitrated and nitrosated hydrocarbons in 2019. Kuwait was ranked 63rd out of 157 countries in the 2019 Economic Complexity Index (ECI). Iraq was Kuwait's leading export market in 2019 and food/agricultural products accounted for 94.2% of total export commodities.

According to data from the Civil Service Commission (CSC), the level of joblessness amongst the Kuwaiti population continues to rise annually as of 2024. This is predominately due to a surplus of graduates in fields that lack demand within the workforce, as well as a discrepancy between labor market requirements and the skills obtained through certain specializations. Additional issues contributing to the unemployment rate include a lack of emphasis on the private sector and insufficient coordination among related authorities. Until substantial changes are made regarding the quality of educational outputs, the number of graduates in less required fields is likely to keep rising, further exacerbating unemployment issues. Statistics from the Central Statistics Bureau as of November 19, 2023 indicate that there are 8,727 unemployed Kuwaitis, including 4,177 males (approximately 48 percent) and 4,550 females (approximately 52 percent).

According to recent statistics released by the Central Statistics Bureau, the population of Kuwait rose to 4.91 million on January 1, 2024 — an increase of 119,700 from 2024's 4.79 million population. The number of Kuwaiti citizens increased by 28,700, totaling 1.545 million, an increase from the 1.517 million figure from the start of 2023. Notably, the number of male citizens reached 758,700 and female citizens rose to 787,000 in January 2024. Additionally, the expatriate population witnessed a rise by 90,990, reaching 3.36 million, among which the male expatriates accounted for 2.26 million and female expatriates stood at 1.1 million in the same period.

== See also ==
- List of companies of Kuwait
- Corruption in Kuwait
- Central Bank of Kuwait
- Kuwait Chamber of Commerce and Industry
- Kuwait Trade Union Federation
- Ministry of Commerce and Industry (Kuwait)
- Ministry of Finance (Kuwait)
- Economy of the Middle East
