= Kuwait Vision 2035 =

Government development plan for Kuwait

- رؤية الكويت 2035; Ru'iyat Al-Kuwayt 2035
- Logo of Kuwait Vision 2035

Agency overview
- Formed: 2017
- Jurisdiction: Government of Kuwait
- Status: In progress
- Agency executive: Emir of Kuwait
- Website: https://www.newkuwait.gov.kw/

The Kuwait Vision 2035 (Arabic: رؤية الكويت ٢٠٣٥, Romanized: Ru'iyat Al-Kuwayt 2035) is an undergoing strategic development plan which outlines Kuwait’s aspirations to transform towards a globally competitive nation by the year 2035. It was adopted in 2017 by the Ministry of Foreign Affairs under the guidance of the country's former ruler: Sabah Al-Ahmad Al-Jaber Al-Sabah.

== Goals ==
The 9 main goals in Kuwait Vision 2035 are:

- The establishment of a private global economic region
- General privatization
- The promotion of a dynamic private sector
- The promotion of local and organization talents
- The development of a transparent and interlinked government
- The construction of coherent infrastructure
- The foundation of a environmentally-harmonious inhabitable lands
- The promotion of public health and well-being
- An active participation in the world community

== Plans ==
The Kuwait Vision 2035 has many projects to implement, such as the inhabited Bubiyan Island constructing a major city, the 1000m tall Burj Mubarak Al Kabir Tower, and the mega city of Madinat Al-Hareer, and far more.

== See also ==
- Madinat Al-Hareer
- Kuwait International Airport
- Economy of Kuwait
- Sheikh Jaber Al-Ahmad Al-Sabah Causeway
- South Al-Mutlaa City
