= Sabah Al Ahmad Sea City =

Sabah Al Ahmad Sea City مدينة صباح الأحمد البحرية
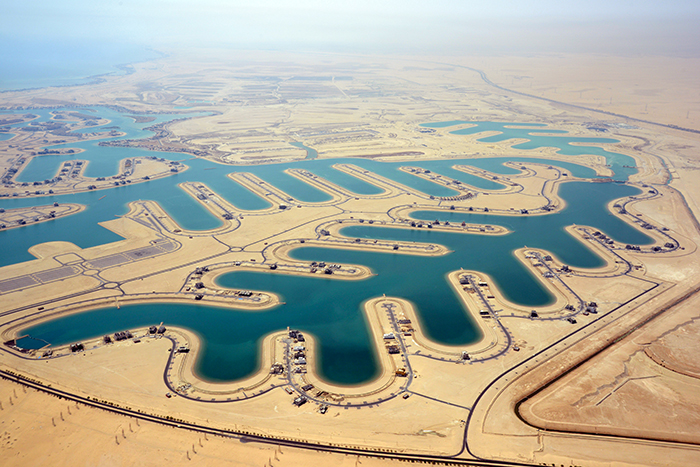
- Aerial view

- Location within Kuwait
- Country: Kuwait
- District: Ahmadi Governorate
- Established: 2016
- Time zone: UTC+3 (AST)
- Website: https://www.saasc.com/

Sabah Al Ahmad Sea City (Arabic: مدينة صباح الأحمد البحرية) is a city and area in Al Khiran (Ahmadi Governorate), Kuwait, built with canals forming 200 kilometres (120 mi) of artificial shoreline. Before construction, the city was expected to house up to 250,000 residents. The city was inaugurated in mid 2016. The concept of the area is unusual because it was built by excavating large channels in the desert rather than on reclaimed land. The city is considered a pioneering project in the region due to its environmentally sustainable construction techniques.

The first phase of the project was opened to the sea in 2004. The multi-billion dollar development has a planned 25-year construction period with ten phases. Sabah Al Ahmad Sea City is the first urban area in Kuwait built entirely by the private sector.

== Wildlife ==
Recent reports demonstrate that Persian Gulf shellfish and finfish fisheries are in serious decline, in particular those of Kuwait. This decline is attributed to over-fishing, pollution, loss of nursery ground, reduction in riverine input via the Shatt Al-Arab, and climate change. When completed, Sabah Al-Ahmad Sea City, Kuwait, will contain c. 200 km (120 mi) of waterways providing over 50% of extra coastline for Kuwait. Seine netting and gargoor traps have been deployed annually, since the first phase (A1) of this coastal township was opened to the sea in 2004, to monitor Shell and Fin fish populations within the waterways. Present work describes the diversity and abundance of commercial (edible and potential ornamental value) species now inhabiting the waterways, which comprise over 60% of the species marketed in Kuwait. Analysis of catch data reveals that the waterways act as spawning, nursery and feeding habitats for important species such as Epinephelus coioides (Orange-Spotted Grouper), Penaeus semisulcatus (Banana Shrimp) and Portunus segnis (Blue Swimming Crab). As no commercial fishing is allowed, the Sea City waterways act as a significant conservation area for Kuwait's fish stocks.

== Environmental impact ==
The environmental impact of the development, from the standpoint of marine life, has been seen as positive and sustainable. According to studies of the development:

Within the waterways, a full range of man-made marine habitats have been created. These include intertidal beaches, tidal flats, mangrove and salt marshes on islands, together with subtidal sand and rock benthic habitats. These have been monitored with daily physical and annual biological surveys. Importantly, this data provides new information on the natural colonization rates and development of Gulf soft substrate intertidal and sub-tidal marine communities. Within five years of opening to the sea, all artificially created marine habitats have a species richness and abundance close to, or exceeding, that of similar open sea natural habitats in Kuwait. Over 1000 species of macrobiota now exist within the desert waterways including 100 species of fish and shellfish.

== Gallery ==
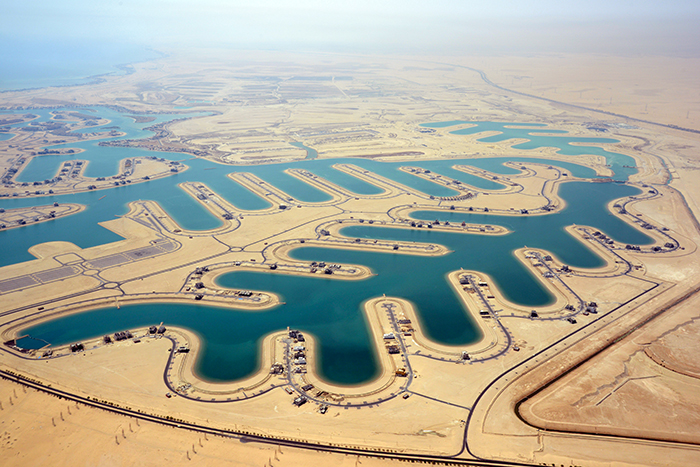

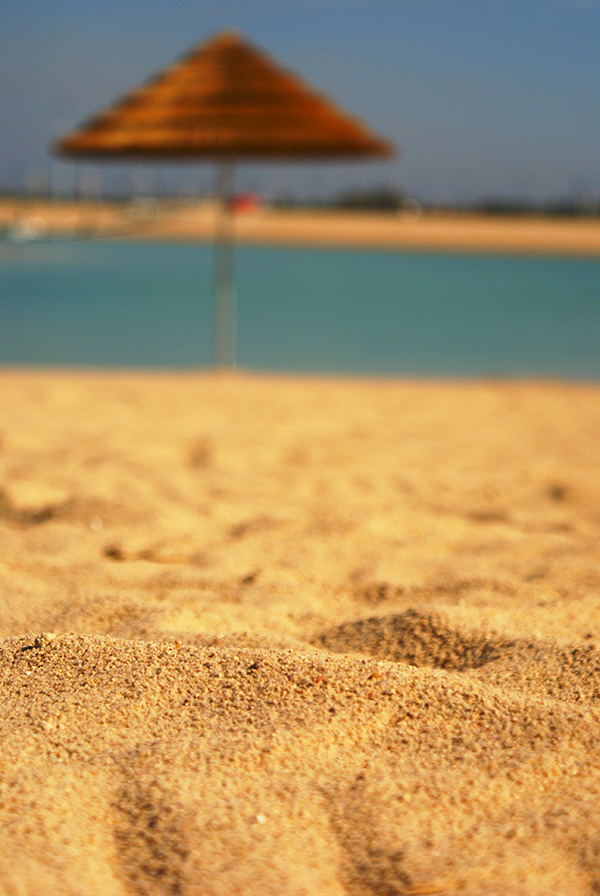

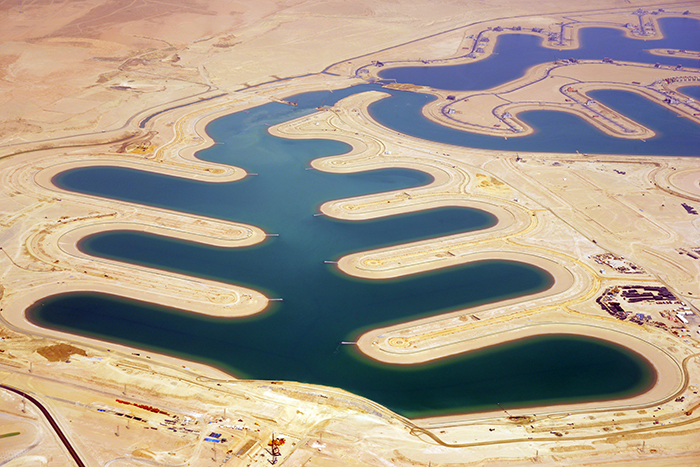

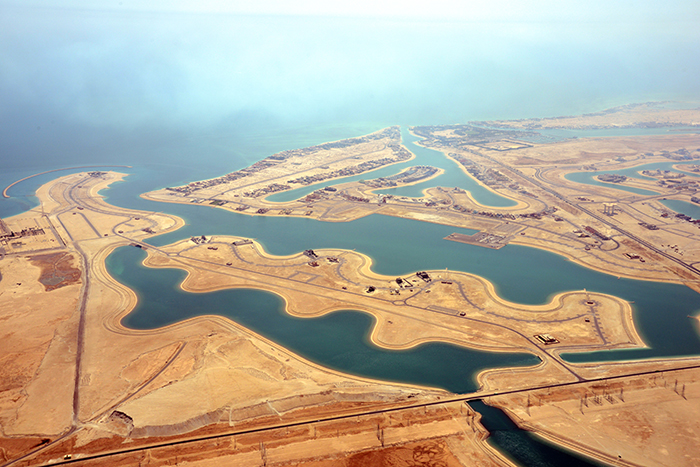

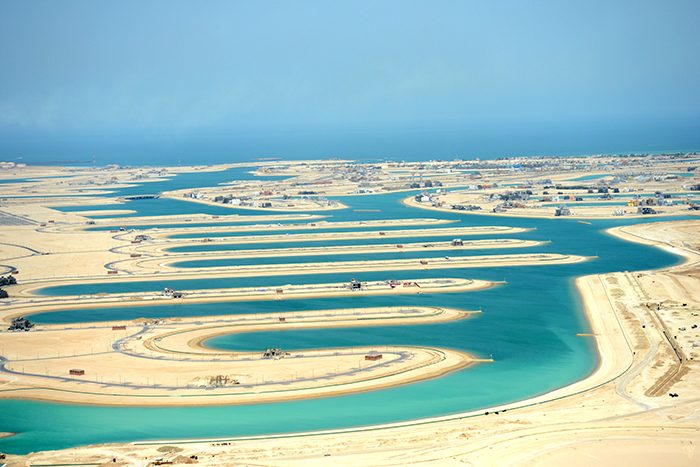

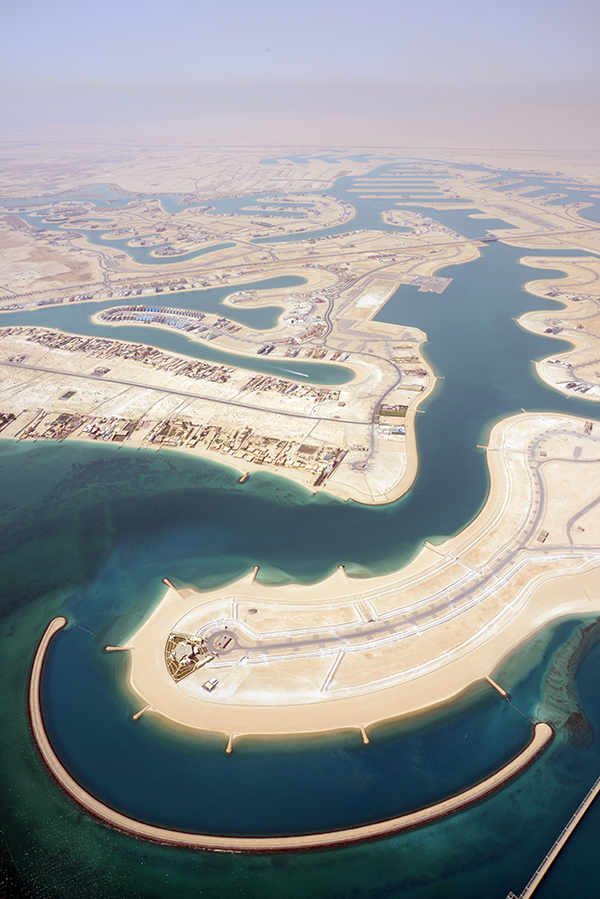

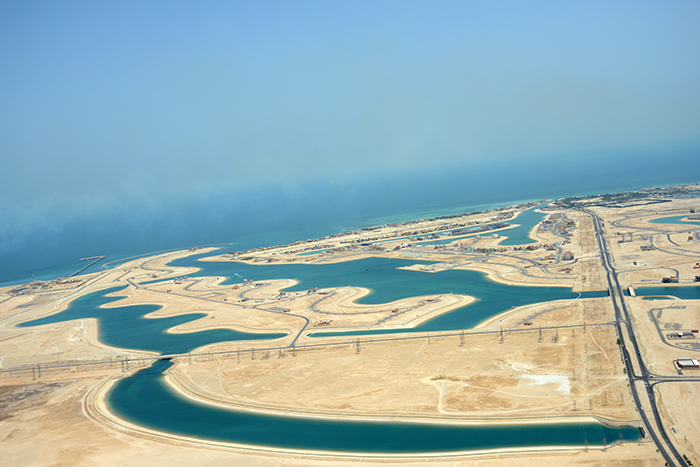

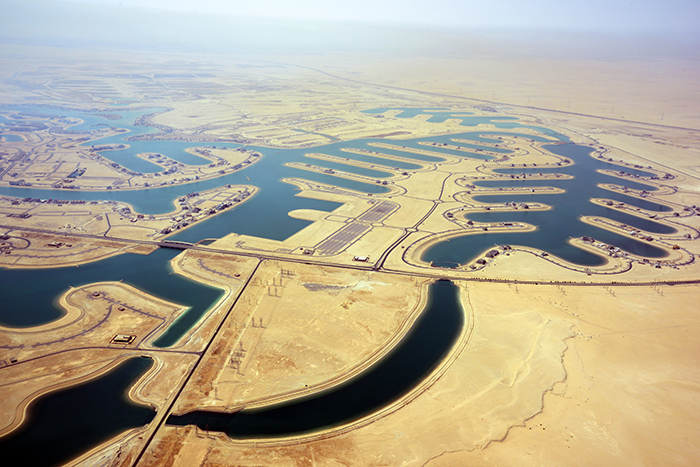

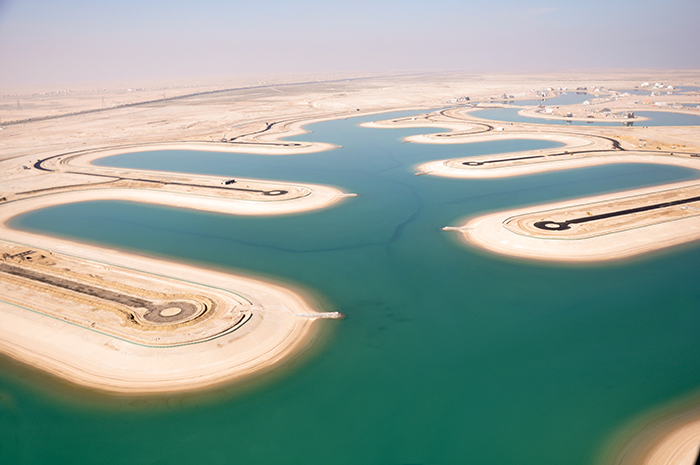

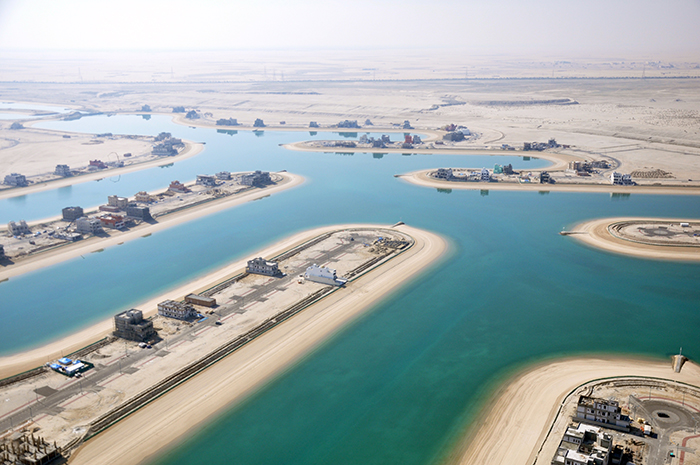

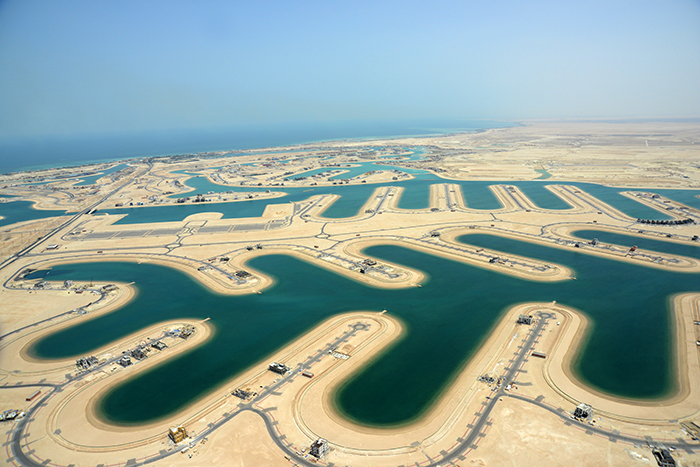

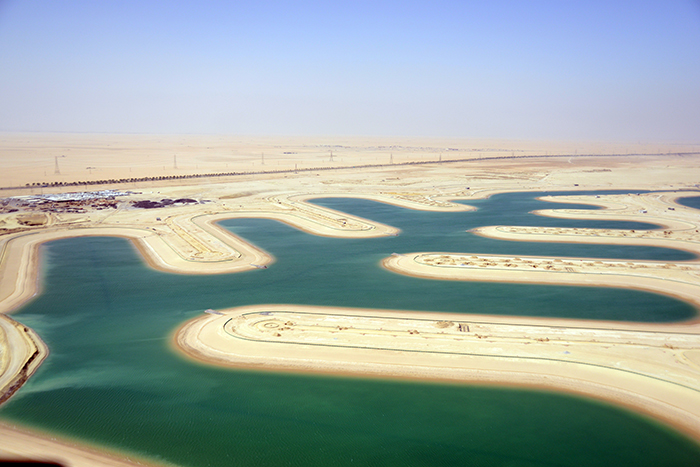

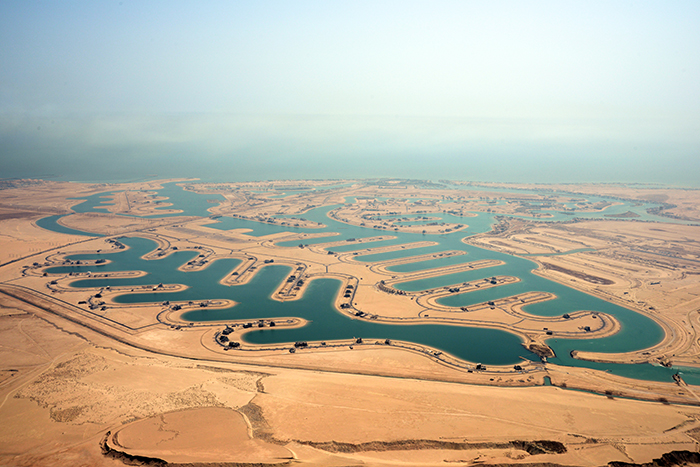

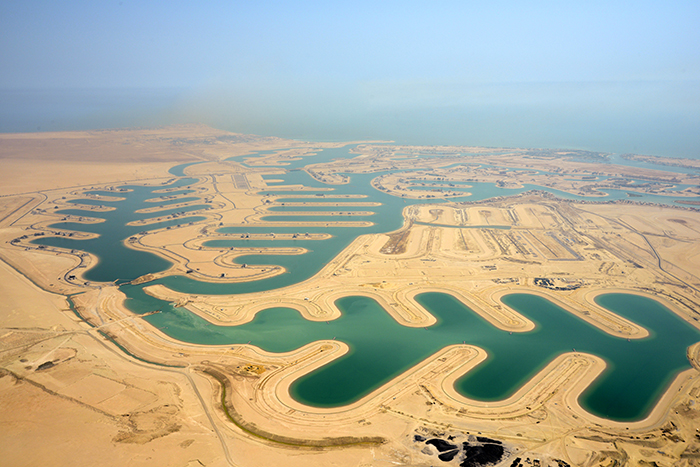

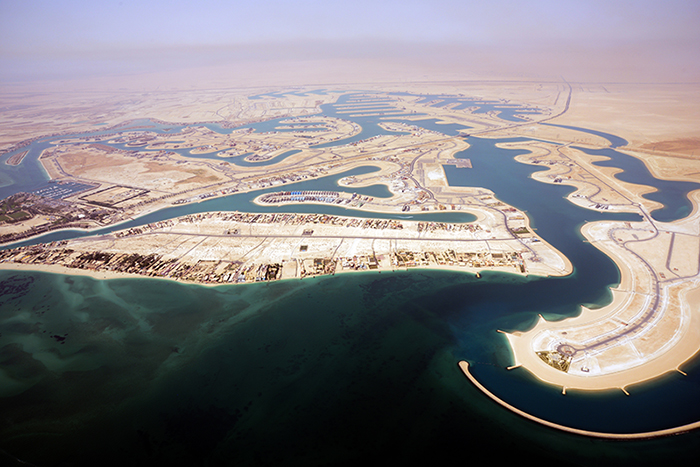

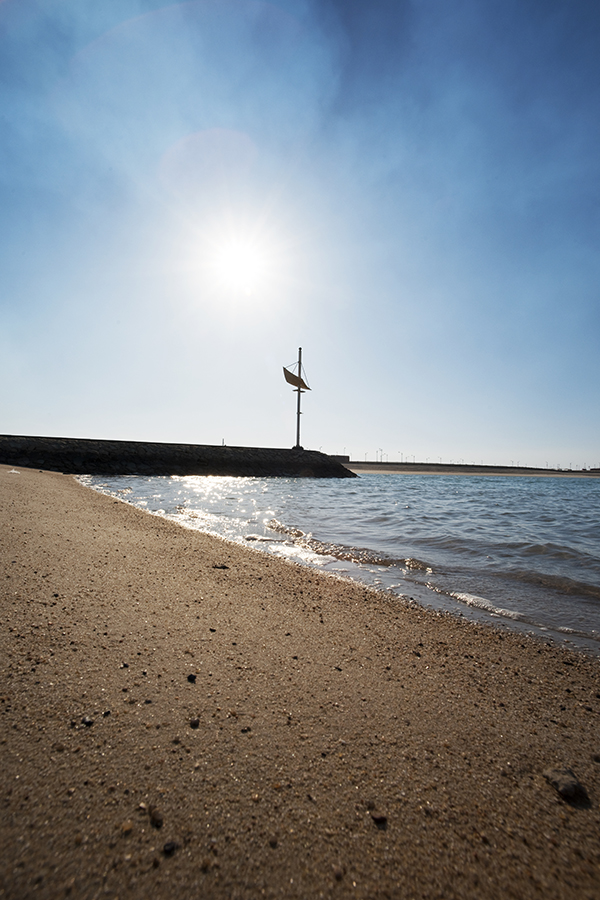

== See also ==
- Madinat al-Hareer
- Sheikh Jaber Al-Ahmad Al-Sabah Causeway
- Al Mutlaa City
- Mubarak Al Kabeer Port
- Kuwait National Cultural District
