= Madinat al-Hareer =

Large infrastructure project in northern Kuwait

Silk City مدينة الحرير
- Location within Kuwait
- Coordinates: 29.617°N 48.067°E
- Country: Kuwait
- District: Jahra Governorate
- Construction began: 2019 (Phase I)
- Time zone: UTC+3 (AST)

Silk City (Arabic: مدينة الحرير, romanized: Madinat al-Hareer) is a large infrastructure project in northern Kuwait which is currently under development (Phase I). The project will be built in individual phases. In May 2019, the Sheikh Jaber Al-Ahmad Al-Sabah Causeway opened as part of the Silk City project's first phase, the project's first phase also includes Mubarak Al Kabeer Port which is currently under construction. The Silk City project is part of China's Belt and Road Initiative.

On September 29th, 2026, The Kuwaiti Cabinet approved a draft decree to abolish the Silk City project, and the Boubyan Island project. While the construction or the existence of Silk City hasn't been officially cancelled yet, the decree poses risks of cancellation to the project.

== Development ==
=== Phase one ===
==== Sheikh Jaber Al-Ahmad Al-Sabah Causeway ====
The first phase of the Silk City project includes construction of the Sheikh Jaber Al-Ahmad Al-Sabah Causeway In May 2019, the causeway was completed and inaugurated. The causeway connects northern Kuwait to Kuwait City. It was one of the largest and most challenging infrastructure projects in the entire world. The project is part of Kuwait Vision 2035, and is named after the 13th Emir of Kuwait to commemorate his leadership. The causeway had an estimated construction value of approximately US$3 billion. It crosses two artificial islands (Bay Island North and Bay Island South) which were constructed for entertainment and tourism purposes.

==== Mubarak Al Kabeer Port ====
Mubarak Al Kabeer Port is part of China's Belt and Road Initiative. Under China's Belt and Road Initiative, the Mubarak Al Kabeer Port is part of the first phase of the Silk City project. In September 2020, it was reported that the port is 53% complete. In March 2021, it was announced that Kuwait and Pakistan will develop linkages between Gwadar Port and Mubarak Al Kabeer Port.

Mubarak Al Kabeer Port is currently under construction. In April 2021, the port's first phase was completed (4 berths). As part of Mubarak Al Kabeer Port's development, Bubiyan Island will contain power plants and substations. A 5,000-megawatt power plant has already been built in Subiya. There is a current road project connecting Mubarak Al Kabeer Port's first phase to the existing road network in Bubiyan Island. Mubarak Al Kabeer Port's first phase is among Kuwait's largest infrastructure projects in 2021. The port is set to be environmentally sustainable. Mubarak Al Kabeer Port's fire stations are currently under development.

Mubarak Al Kabeer Port is part of the Gulf Railway project in Kuwait.

==== Development of Subiya ====
Madinat al-Hareer (Silk City) is being developed in a phased manner, including Subiya as part of the first phase of the city. With the completion of Sheikh Jaber Al-Ahmad Al-Sabah Causeway, a slow but steady development is taking place in Subiya. A deadline for accepting tenders for Silk City has been set for 31 March 2022. A power plant of 5,000 megawatts has already been built in Subiya, the Subiya power plant is the nation's largest electrical generation facility. New police and fire stations recently opened in Subiya. In addition, several mosques and an ambulance hospital recently opened in Subiya. There are a number of new power plants under development in Subiya at the moment. The bridge connecting Subiya to Bubiyan Island recently finished construction.

In June 2019, the Supreme Council for Planning and Development's Secretary General, Dr. Khaled Mahdi, reported the following:

There are three components to the Silk City project that are considered as main prerequisites for the success of the Special Economic Zone or Northern Region project - known locally as the Silk City project. (a) the masterplan which is currently in progress and is being finalized by the consultants who are also working out the project’s feasibility, zoning and implementation; (b) the financing model which will be developed once the masterplan has been articulated to allow 100% financing by the private sector. Until now, the engagement of the public sector hasn’t yet been addressed; and (c) the legislative framework, and, in fact, a draft of the new legislation has recently been submitted to the National Assembly for review. The Silk City Authority (Medinat Al-Hareer Authority) oversees the project; previously, it was under the authority of the Council of Ministers. Now, it is under the authority of the Deputy Prime Minister Sheikh Nasser Al-Sabah.

== Design ==
Projects such as Silk City are part of Kuwait Vision 2035. According to Kuwait Vision 2035, the northern region of Kuwait will be developed through the Northern Economic Zone (Bubiyan Island, Abdali, Subiya, and other areas in the northern zone). The northern zone entails developing mutually beneficial economic ties with Iraq and Iran. When Silk City is completed, nature reserves, business and residential facilities, as well as hotels and residential areas, will be included in the free trade zone. A causeway linking northern Kuwait to Kuwait City is named Sheikh Jaber Al-Ahmad Al-Sabah Causeway 36-kilometer-long (22 mi). By using the causeway, driving time from Kuwait City to northern Kuwait is cut to only 15 minutes, instead of at least one-and-a-half hours normally taking to go around Kuwait Bay.

Kuwaiti Government approved a decree in June 2014 establishing an entity that is responsible for developing Silk City and Boubyan Island. Also, Kuwait and China signed a collaboration agreement for developing Silk City and its economic belt. In the final masterplan of Silk City, approved on 3 June 2014, previous proposals were discarded and newer designs were created. As one of the city's economic languages, Chinese will be included alongside Arabic and English.

Four sections are tentatively set to be included in the city.

Proposed skyscraper

One of the project's main proposed attractions is the Burj Mubarak Al Kabir which would stand at 1,001 m (3,284 ft) tall in order to reflect the Arabian folk tale collection One Thousand and One Arabian Nights. Skyscrapers do not normally exceed 80 floors. Although the Mubarak al-Kabir Tower would have a greater number of floors, the elevators would have to be double-deckers due to the amount of space taken up by elevators. Due to its immense height, the building is vulnerable to high winds. To maintain stability in the face of these winds, the proposed design includes three interlocking towers, each twisted 45 degrees to support the structure. Moreover, there would be vertical ailerons running the entire length of the building on each edge. As these ailerons were positioned, the winds would be redirected so as to minimize structural noise. Linking the neighborhoods will be several four-story town squares.

== See also ==
- Al Mutlaa City
- Sheikh Jaber Al-Ahmad Al-Sabah Causeway
- Mubarak Al Kabeer Port
- Kuwait National Cultural District
- Sabah Al Ahmad Sea City
