= 2026 Bubiyan Island raid =

2026 Iran war raid

Bubiyan Island incident
- Part of the 2026 Iran war
- 2026 Bubiyan Island raid (Kuwait)
Date	1 May 2026
Location	Bubiyan Island, Kuwait
Result	Kuwaiti victory

Belligerents
Kuwait	Iran

Strength
Unknown	6 IRGC troops

Casualties and losses
1 injured	4 captured

On 1 May 2026, Iran allegedly dispatched six troops of the Islamic Revolutionary Guard Corps (IRGC) to Bubiyan Island in Kuwait, according to the latter. The IRGC and Kuwait Armed Forces exchanged fire, resulting in the injury of one Kuwaiti soldier. Four of the IRGC troops were captured, while the remainder fled. The incident took place during the ceasefire of the 2026 Iran war. The Iranian foreign ministry rejected the allegation, claiming the four officers accidentally entered Kuwaiti waters due to a navigation system failure.

== Background ==
On 28 February 2026, following the outbreak of the 2026 Iran war caused by the airstrikes on Iran by the United States and Israel, Iran began launching a series of retaliatory strikes on U.S. bases and U.S.-allied Arab countries in West Asia, which included strikes on Kuwait. Iran repeatedly attacked Kuwait International Airport with drone strikes.

Bubiyan island hosts the China-funded Mubarak Al Kabeer Port as part of China's Belt and Road Initiative.

== Raid ==
According to the Kuwaiti interior ministry, on 1 May 2026, the six IRGC troops were sent aboard a rented fishing boat to infiltrate the strategically important Bubiyan Island, which is southwest of the mouth of the Shatt al-Arab river that divides Iraq and Iran. The ministry identified all six troops and said they included lieutenants of the Islamic Republic of Iran Navy and Islamic Republic of Iran Army. The four captured attackers were identified as two IRGC naval captains, an IRGC naval lieutenant, and an IRGC army lieutenant. The two escapees included Navy Captain Mansour Qambari and the boat's captain Abdulali Kazem Siamari.

Kuwait said that the men were sent to carry out "hostile acts" and that four of the six were detained; the remaining two escaped. On 3 May, Kuwait announced that one of its security officials had been wounded in the attack, but it was not until 12 May that it accused Iran of the attack. Iran has not acknowledged the attack.

== Reactions ==
The Kuwaiti Ministry of Foreign Affairs condemned the incursion as a "flagrant violation" of Kuwaiti sovereignty and a grave breach of international law, and demanded Iran to immediately and unconditionally cease "unlawful hostile acts." Kuwait also reserved its right to self-defense, holding Iran fully responsible for the attack.

Bahrain condemned the infiltration and affirmed Kuwait's "full right to take all necessary measures to safeguard its sovereignty and protect its people."

The Iranian foreign ministry dismissed the allegation as "absolutely baseless" and stated that the four officers had entered Kuwaiti seas by mistake "due to a disruption in the navigation system". Iranian foreign minister Abbas Araghchi condemned the attack on the Iranian boat and detention of four Iranian citizens and said that Iran reserves the right to respond. He described the attack as an "illegal act" which "took place near island used by the U.S. to attack Iran."
