= Bubiyan Island =

Island in the Persian Gulf

Bubyan Island
Native name: جزيرة بوبيان (Arabic)
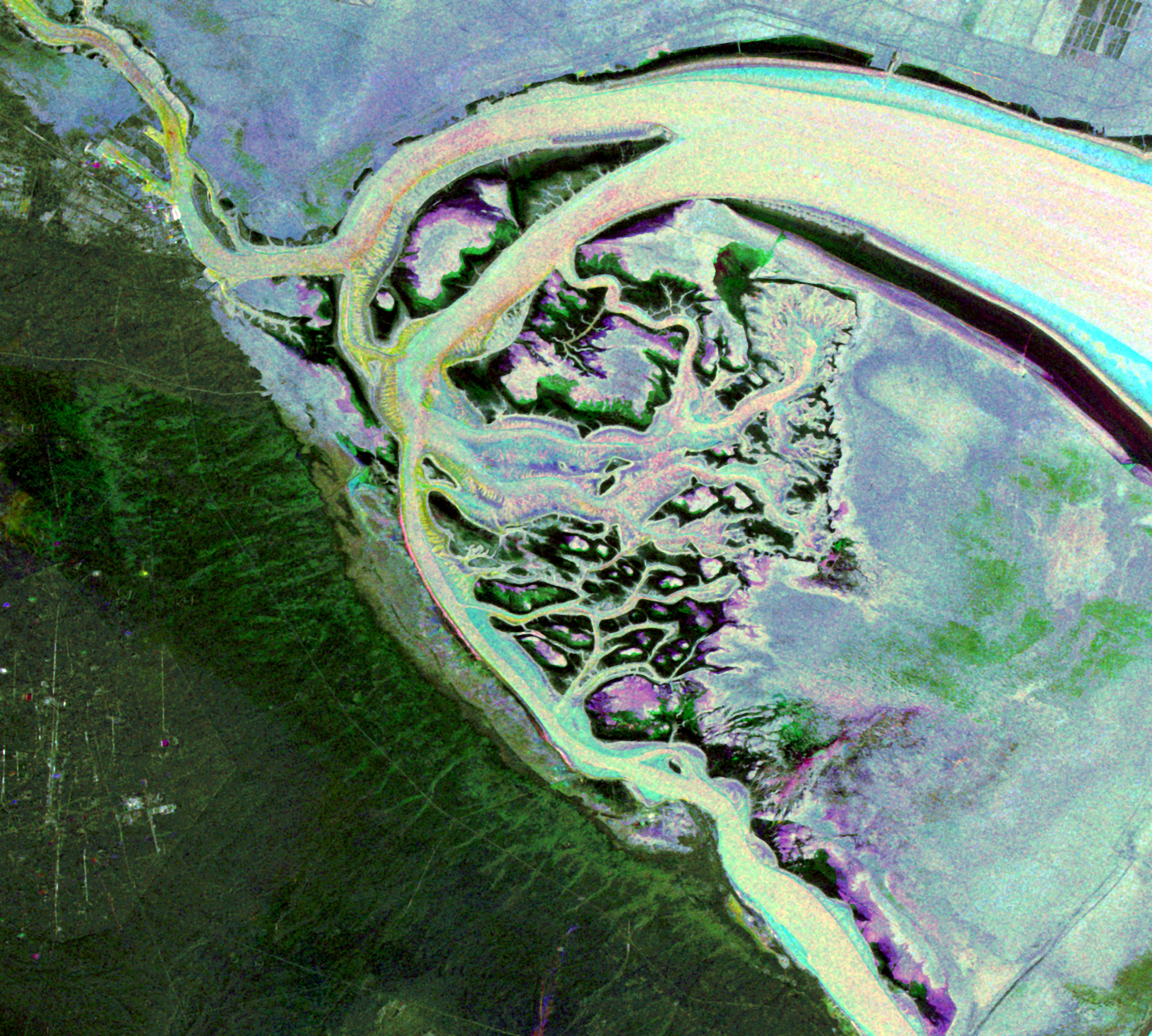
- A false-color satellite image of Kuwaiti islands at the northwest corner of the Persian Gulf. Bubiyan is the light-blue mass taking up most of the right side of the image.

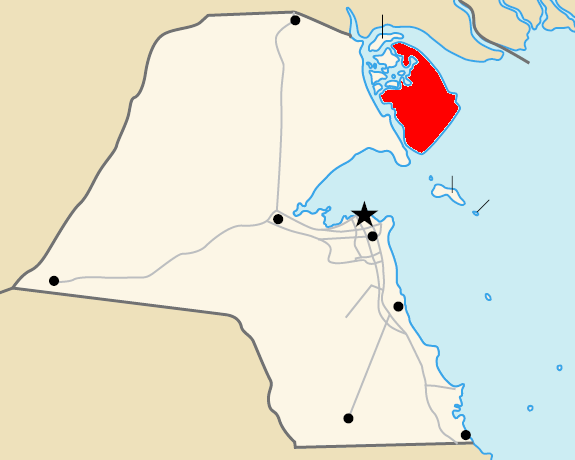
- The location of Bubiyan Island in Kuwait

Geography
- Location: Persian Gulf
- Coordinates: 29°47′N 48°11′E
- Area: 863 km^{2} (333 sq mi)
- Length: 40 km (25 mi)
- Width: 24 km (14.9 mi)
- Highest elevation: 322 ft (98.1 m)

Administration
- Kuwait

Demographics
- Population: 0

Designations

Ramsar Wetland
- Official name: Mubarak Al-Kabeer Reserve
- Designated: 5 September 2015
- Reference no.: 2239

Bubiyan Island (Arabic: جزيرة بوبيان) is the largest island in the Kuwaiti coastal island chain situated in the north-western corner of the Persian Gulf, with an area of 863 km^{2} (333 sq mi). Bubiyan Island is part of the Shatt al-Arab delta.

Bubiyan is the largest of a group of eight islands situated just southwest of the mouth of the Shaṭṭ al-Arab, the river that divides Iraq and Iran.

== History ==
=== Antiquity ===
Bubiyan was formed by sediment from the Tigris–Euphrates river. There is archaeological evidence of Sasanian (300–650 AD) to early Islamic (650–800 AD) periods of human presence on Bubiyan as evidenced by the recent discovery of torpedo-jar pottery sherds on several prominent beach ridges.

=== Gulf War ===
During the Gulf War of 1991, there was a large oil spill in the area. Four spans of the bridge were destroyed. They were rebuilt in 1999. The island itself was converted into a military base in 1991. In November 1994, Iraq formally accepted the UN-demarcated border with Kuwait which had been spelled out in Security Council Resolutions 687 (1991), 773 (1992), and 833 (1993) which formally ended an earlier Iraqi claim to Bubiyan Island.

=== Ramsar Convention ===
In response to Kuwait becoming the 169th signatory of the Ramsar Convention, the Mubarak al-Kabeer reserve was designated as the country's first Wetland of International Importance. The 50,948 hectare reserve consists of small lagoons and shallow salt marshes and is important as a stop-over for migrating birds on two migration routes, Turkey to India and Eurasia to Africa. Breeding waterbirds include the world's largest breeding colony of crab-plover (Dromas ardeola). The surrounding sea is a major nursery for many commercial fish species.

=== 2026 Iran war ===
On 1 May 2026, the island was subject to an armed incursion by six armed members of the IRGC as part of the 2026 Iran war. The incursion was repelled and resulted in the arrest of four of the attackers.

== Geography ==
The island is mainly flat, while salt marshes cover some coasts. There are several intermittent wadis in the center of the island. It is separated from the Iraqi coast in the northeast by the Al-Zubayr channel and from the Kuwaiti mainland in the southwest by the Al-Sabiyyah channel.

The Al-Sabiyyah channel wraps around the northern end of Bubiyan Island, separating it from Warbah Island. 5.4 km (3 mi) northwest of Ras al Barshah, the southernmost point, Bubiyan is linked to the mainland by a concrete girder bridge over the Khawr as Sabiyah channel, 2.38 km (1.48 mi) long, built in 1981-1983 and opened February 1983.

During high spring tides and southerly gales the wet, low lying mud flats that make up most of the island are encroached upon by sea water. The island is considered to be at risk of inundation due to sea level rise.

== Mubarak Al Kabeer Port ==
Mubarak Al Kabeer Port is part of China's Belt and Road Initiative. Under China's Belt and Road Initiative, the Mubarak Al Kabeer Port is part of the first phase of the Silk City project. In September 2020, it was reported that the port is 53% complete. In March 2021, it was announced that Kuwait and Pakistan will develop linkages between Gwadar Port and Mubarak Al Kabeer Port. The Mubarak Al Kabeer Port is under construction. As part of Mubarak Al Kabeer Port's development, Bubiyan Island will contain power plants and substations. A 5,000-megawatt power plant has been built in Subiya.

== In literature ==
The island is mentioned in the 1933 science fiction work The Shape of Things to Come by H. G. Wells, in which it provides the recreational facilities for a conference at Basra.

== See also ==
- Battle of Bubiyan
- Economy of Kuwait
- Mubarak Al Kabeer Port
- Sheikh Jaber Al-Ahmad Al-Sabah Causeway
- Madinat al-Hareer
- Al Mutlaa City
