= Khaled Mahdi =

Khaled Mahdi may refer to:

- Khaled Mahdi (footballer) (born 1987), Palestinian footballer
- Khaled A. Mahdi (born 1970), Kuwaiti government official
