= Burj Mubarak Al Kabir =

Proposed skyscraper on the Kuwait Vision 2035 project

- برج مبارك الكبير Burj Mubarak Al Kabir (Kuwait)

General information
- Status: Proposed
- Type: Skyscraper
- Location: Madinat Al Hareer, Kuwait
- Coordinates: 29.637526°N 48.172814°E
- Cost: 25,000,000,000 Kuwaiti Dinars

Technical details
- Floor count: 234

Design and construction
- Architect: Santiago Calatrava

The Mubarak Al Kabir Tower (Arabic: برج مبارك الكبير, Romanized: Burj Mubarak Al Kabir) is a proposed skyscraper expected to make up part of the Kuwaiti government development plan Kuwait Vision 2035 that will be located in the infrastructure project Madinat al-Hareer. It would be the tallest building in Kuwait at 1,001 m (3,284 ft). The developers of the tower are the Tamdeen Group, who are also working on the rest of Madinat al-Hareer. Its design is based on the Arabian folktale collection One Thousand and One Nights.. It was announced that architect Santiago Calatrava will design the building.

== See also ==
- Al Hamra Tower
- Jeddah Tower
- List of tallest buildings in Kuwait
- List of visionary tall buildings and structures
- Madinat Al-Hareer
