= List of parties to the Ramsar Convention =

List of member states in the Ramsar Convention

Ramsar logo

This is a list of parties contracting to the Ramsar Convention on Wetlands of International Importance Especially as Waterfowl Habitat, also known as the Convention on Wetlands. The convention's mission is "the conservation and wise use of all wetlands through local and national actions and international cooperation, as a contribution towards achieving sustainable development throughout the world". It calls upon contracting parties to recognize the interdependence of humans and the environment as well as the ecological functions of wetlands, such as wildlife habitat, nutrient cycling, and flood control.

The Ramsar Convention is the oldest multilateral international conservation convention and the only one to deal with one habitat or ecosystem type, wetlands. The convention's headquarters are in Gland, Switzerland, and it works closely with the International Union for Conservation of Nature.

The convention was held in the city of Ramsar, Iran, in February 1971 and was originally contracted by seven countries when it came into force on 21 December 1975. As of March 2026, there are 172 contracting parties and 2,526 designated sites covering 253,150,727 hectares (625,549,070 acres). All of the contracting parties have designated at least one Ramsar site, and 32 of the contracting countries have only one site. The country with the most sites is the United Kingdom with 175. To become a Ramsar site, a site must be nominated by a contracting country, meet at least one of nine criteria, and undergo scientific review.

Russia, which had 35 Ramsar sites, announced its withdrawal on 22 July 2025.

The table lists the countries contracting to the convention, the entry date of each country to the convention, the number of Ramsar sites in each country, and the total area of all Ramsar sites in each country.

Ramsar Convention contracting parties
Country	Region	Entry date	Ramsar sites	Area	
Country	Region	Entry date	Ramsar sites	hectares	acres
Albania	Europe	29 February 1996	4	98,181	242,610
Algeria	Africa	4 March 1984	50	3,032,813	7,494,240
Andorra	Europe	23 November 2012	3	6,870	17,000
Angola	Africa	10 October 2021	1	5,367,000	13,260,000
Antigua and Barbuda	Latin America and the Caribbean	2 October 2005	1	3,600	8,900
Argentina	Latin America and the Caribbean	4 September 1992	24	6,085,995	15,038,820
Armenia	Europe	6 November 1993	3	493,511	1,219,490
Australia	Oceania	21 December 1975	67	8,378,162	20,702,890
Austria	Europe	16 April 1983	26	126,556	312,730
Azerbaijan	Europe	21 September 2001	2	99,560	246,000
Bahamas	Latin America and the Caribbean	7 June 1997	1	32,600	81,000
Bahrain	Asia	27 February 1998	2	6,810	16,800
Bangladesh	Asia	21 September 1992	2	611,200	1,510,000
Barbados	Latin America and the Caribbean	12 April 2006	1	33	82
Belarus	Europe	25 August 1991	26	777,895	1,922,220
Belgium	Europe	4 July 1986	9	46,944	116,000
Belize	Latin America and the Caribbean	22 August 1998	2	23,592	58,300
Benin	Africa	24 May 2000	4	2,587,342	6,393,460
Bhutan	Asia	7 September 2012	3	1,225	3,030
Bolivia (Plurinational State of)	Latin America and the Caribbean	27 October 1990	11	14,842,405	36,676,380
Bosnia and Herzegovina	Europe	1 March 1992	3	57,192	141,320
Botswana	Africa	9 April 1997	1	5,537,400	13,683,000
Brazil	Latin America and the Caribbean	24 September 1993	27	26,794,455	66,210,540
Bulgaria	Europe	24 January 1976	11	49,397	122,060
Burkina Faso	Africa	27 October 1990	25	1,940,481	4,795,030
Burundi	Africa	5 October 2002	4	78,515	194,010
Cambodia	Asia	23 October 1999	5	85,235	210,620
Cameroon	Africa	20 July 2006	7	827,060	2,043,700
Canada	North America	15 May 1981	37	13,086,767	32,338,110
Cape Verde	Africa	18 November 2005	4	2,300	5,700
Central African Republic	Africa	5 April 2006	2	376,300	930,000
Chad	Africa	13 October 1990	6	12,405,068	30,653,590
Chile	Latin America and the Caribbean	27 November 1981	16	363,927	899,280
China	Asia	31 July 1992	82	7,647,895	18,898,360
Colombia	Latin America and the Caribbean	18 October 1998	10	814,717	2,013,210
Comoros	Africa	9 June 1995	3	16,030	39,600
Congo	Africa	18 October 1998	14	13,813,865	34,134,800
Costa Rica	Latin America and the Caribbean	27 April 1992	12	569,742	1,407,860
Côte d'Ivoire	Africa	27 June 1996	6	127,344	314,670
Croatia	Europe	25 June 1991	5	93,590	231,300
Cuba	Latin America and the Caribbean	12 August 2001	6	1,188,411	2,936,630
Cyprus	Europe	11 November 2001	1	1,107	2,740
Czech Republic	Europe	1 January 1993	14	60,207	148,770
Democratic People's Republic of Korea	Asia	16 January 2018	2	7,241	17,890
Democratic Republic of the Congo	Africa	18 May 1996	4	11,906,617	29,421,890
Denmark	Europe	2 January 1978	43	2,335,939	5,772,230
Djibouti	Africa	22 March 2003	1	3,000	7,400
Dominican Republic	Latin America and the Caribbean	15 September 2002	6	225,173	556,410
Ecuador	Latin America and the Caribbean	7 January 1991	19	1,064,483	2,630,390
Egypt	Africa	9 September 1988	4	415,532	1,026,800
El Salvador	Latin America and the Caribbean	22 May 1999	8	228,719	565,180
Equatorial Guinea	Africa	2 October 2003	3	136,000	340,000
Estonia	Europe	29 July 1994	17	306,481	757,330
Eswatini	Africa	15 June 2013	3	1,183	2,920
Fiji	Oceania	11 August 2006	2	135,515	334,860
Finland	Europe	21 December 1975	49	799,518	1,975,650
France	Europe	1 December 1986	57	3,911,050	9,664,400
Gabon	Africa	30 April 1987	9	3,001,769	7,417,530
The Gambia	Africa	16 January 1997	3	31,244	77,210
Georgia	Europe	7 June 1997	4	36,010	89,000
Germany	Europe	26 June 1976	35	869,265	2,148,000
Ghana	Africa	22 June 1988	6	176,134	435,240
Greece	Europe	21 December 1975	10	163,501	404,020
Grenada	Latin America and the Caribbean	22 September 2012	1	518	1,280
Guatemala	Latin America and the Caribbean	26 October 1990	7	628,592	1,553,280
Guinea	Africa	18 March 1993	16	9,065,446	22,401,200
Guinea-Bissau	Africa	14 May 1990	4	1,189,633	2,939,650
Honduras	Latin America and the Caribbean	23 October 1993	12	305,927	755,960
Hungary	Europe	11 August 1979	29	260,668	644,120
Iceland	Europe	2 April 1978	6	128,666	317,940
India	Asia	1 February 1982	98	1,384,140	3,420,300
Indonesia	Asia	8 August 1992	8	1,375,426	3,398,750
Iran (Islamic Republic of)	Asia	21 December 1975	27	1,494,371	3,692,670
Iraq	Asia	17 February 2008	4	537,900	1,329,000
Ireland	Europe	15 March 1985	45	66,994	165,550
Israel	Europe	12 March 1997	2	366	900
Italy	Europe	14 April 1977	63	81,091	200,380
Jamaica	Latin America and the Caribbean	7 February 1998	4	37,847	93,520
Japan	Asia	17 October 1980	54	166,134	410,530
Jordan	Asia	10 May 1977	2	13,472	33,290
Kazakhstan	Asia	2 May 2007	10	3,188,557	7,879,100
Kenya	Africa	5 October 1990	6	265,449	655,940
Kiribati	Oceania	3 August 2013	1	1,033	2,550
Kuwait	Asia	5 September 2015	1	50,948	125,900
Kyrgyzstan	Asia	12 March 2003	3	679,408	1,678,850
Lao People's Democratic Republic	Asia	28 October 2010	2	14,760	36,500
Latvia	Europe	25 November 1995	6	150,318	371,440
Lebanon	Asia	16 August 1999	4	1,075	2,660
Lesotho	Africa	1 November 2004	1	434	1,070
Liberia	Africa	2 November 2003	5	95,879	236,920
Libya	Africa	5 August 2000	2	83	210
Liechtenstein	Europe	6 December 1991	1	101	250
Lithuania	Europe	20 December 1993	7	65,581	162,050
Luxembourg	Europe	15 August 1998	2	17,213	42,530
Madagascar	Africa	25 January 1999	21	2,147,911	5,307,600
Malawi	Africa	14 March 1997	1	286,356	707,600
Malaysia	Asia	10 March 1995	7	134,182	331,570
Mali	Africa	25 September 1987	4	4,204,640	10,389,900
Malta	Europe	30 January 1989	2	117	290
Marshall Islands	Oceania	13 November 2004	2	70,119	173,270
Mauritania	Africa	22 February 1983	4	1,240,600	3,066,000
Mauritius	Africa	30 September 2001	3	401	990
Mexico	North America	4 November 1986	144	8,721,911	21,552,310
Monaco	Europe	20 December 1997	1	23	57
Mongolia	Asia	8 April 1998	11	1,439,530	3,557,200
Montenegro	Europe	3 June 1996	3	21,627	53,440
Morocco	Africa	20 October 1980	38	316,086	781,070
Mozambique	Africa	3 December 2004	2	4,534,872	11,205,910
Myanmar	Asia	17 March 2005	7	278,913	689,210
Namibia	Africa	23 December 1995	5	676,564	1,671,830
Nepal	Asia	17 April 1988	10	60,561	149,650
Netherlands	Europe	23 September 1980	58	928,513	2,294,410
New Zealand	Oceania	13 December 1976	7	67,186	166,020
Nicaragua	Latin America and the Caribbean	30 November 1997	9	406,852	1,005,350
Niger	Africa	30 August 1987	14	7,534,289	18,617,630
Nigeria	Africa	2 February 2001	17	1,077,468	2,662,480
North Macedonia	Europe	8 September 1991	3	46,821	115,700
Norway	Europe	21 December 1975	63	909,134	2,246,520
Oman	Asia	19 August 2013	3	213,876	528,500
Pakistan	Asia	23 November 1976	19	1,343,627	3,320,170
Palau	Oceania	18 February 2003	1	500	1,200
Panama	Latin America and the Caribbean	26 November 1990	6	285,487	705,450
Papua New Guinea	Oceania	16 July 1993	2	594,924	1,470,090
Paraguay	Latin America and the Caribbean	7 October 1995	6	785,970	1,942,200
Peru	Latin America and the Caribbean	30 March 1992	14	6,789,685	16,777,680
Philippines	Asia	8 November 1994	10	431,890	1,067,200
Poland	Europe	22 March 1978	19	152,964	377,980
Portugal	Europe	24 March 1981	32	133,527	329,950
Republic of Korea	Asia	28 July 1997	26	20,265	50,080
Republic of Moldova	Europe	20 October 2000	3	94,705	234,020
Romania	Europe	21 September 1991	20	1,177,748	2,910,280
Rwanda	Africa	1 April 2006	1	6,736	16,650
Saint Lucia	Latin America and the Caribbean	19 June 2002	2	85	210
Samoa	Oceania	6 February 2005	3	5,767	14,250
Sao Tome and Principe	Africa	21 December 2006	1	23	57
Saudi Arabia	Asia	2 August 2025	1	10,609.0	26,215
Senegal	Africa	11 November 1977	9	159,137	393,240
Serbia	Europe	27 April 1992 (ratified as the Federal Republic of Yugoslavia)	11	130,411	322,250
Seychelles	Africa	22 March 2005	3	44,025	108,790
Sierra Leone	Africa	13 April 2000	1	295,000	730,000
Slovakia	Europe	1 January 1993	14	40,697	100,560
Slovenia	Europe	25 June 1991	3	8,205	20,270
South Africa	Africa	21 December 1975	32	608,905	1,504,640
South Sudan	Africa	10 October 2013	1	5,700,000	14,000,000
Spain	Europe	4 September 1982	76	313,083	773,640
Sri Lanka	Asia	15 October 1990	6	198,172	489,690
Sudan	Africa	7 May 2005	4	3,436,009	8,490,560
Suriname	Latin America and the Caribbean	22 November 1985	1	12,000	30,000
Sweden	Europe	21 December 1975	68	665,474	1,644,420
Switzerland	Europe	16 May 1976	11	14,690	36,300
Syrian Arab Republic	Asia	5 July 1998	1	10,000	25,000
Tajikistan	Asia	18 November 2001	5	94,600	234,000
Thailand	Asia	13 September 1998	16	406,699	1,004,980
Togo	Africa	4 November 1995	4	1,210,400	2,991,000
Trinidad and Tobago	Latin America and the Caribbean	21 April 1993	3	15,919	39,340
Tunisia	Africa	24 March 1981	42	844,685	2,087,260
Turkey	Europe	13 November 1994	14	184,487	455,880
Turkmenistan	Asia	3 July 2009	1	267,124	660,080
Uganda	Africa	4 July 1988	12	454,303	1,122,610
Ukraine	Europe	1 December 1991	50	802,604	1,983,280
United Arab Emirates	Asia	29 December 2007	10	39,166	96,780
United Kingdom	Europe	5 May 1976	175	1,283,040	3,170,500
United Republic of Tanzania	Africa	13 August 2000	4	4,868,424	12,030,140
United States of America	North America	18 December 1986	41	1,884,551	4,656,830
Uruguay	Latin America and the Caribbean	22 September 1984	3	435,837	1,076,980
Uzbekistan	Asia	8 February 2002	4	674,400	1,666,000
Vanuatu	Oceania	4 November 2019	1	8,248.1	20,381
Venezuela (Bolivarian Republic of)	Latin America and the Caribbean	23 November 1988	5	265,668	656,480
Vietnam	Asia	20 January 1989	9	120,549	297,880
Yemen	Asia	8 February 2008	1	580	1,400
Zambia	Africa	28 December 1991	8	4,030,500	9,960,000
Zimbabwe	Africa	3 May 2013	7	453,828	1,121,430

== See also ==
- List of Ramsar sites
- Ramsar Classification System for Wetland Type
- Ramsar Convention
- Ramsar Wetland Conservation Award
