= Kuwait Trade Union Federation =

- Kuwait Trade Union Federation الاتحاد العام لعمال الكويت
- Founded: 1968
- Headquarters: Kuwait City, Kuwait
- Location: Kuwait
- Members: 60,000 - Most members come from Kuwait Oil Company
- Affiliations: International Trade Union Confederation

The Kuwait Trade Union Federation (Arabic: الاتحاد العام لعمال الكويت) is the sole national trade union center in Kuwait. It was founded in 1968 and is affiliated with the International Trade Union Confederation.

As of 2020, there were 38 trade unions in Kuwait, of which 15 are formally members of the Kuwait Trade Union Federation. Outside the oil sector, the federation does not have any trade union affiliates that cover workers in the private sector.

== Legal context ==
The freedoms of association and collective bargaining in Kuwait are recognized by law; however, they are strictly regulated. For instance, Article 104 of the Labor Act "prohibits unions from interfering in political, religious, and sectarian issues". In 2021, the International Labour Organization's Committee of Experts on the Application of Conventions and Recommendations, noted that the Kuwaiti government has failed "to eliminate the total ban on political activities of trade unions that is enshrined in section 104(1)." The committee further said "It notes with regret that the Government has not taken any measures in this regard" and urged the government to revise the Law "to allow for legitimate political activities of trade unions" in the country.

Under Kuwaiti law, the Kuwait Trade Union Federation is the only federation of trade unions permitted to exist on a national level, although the government permits limited trade union pluralism at the local level. However, despite these restrictions, some unions exist outside of the Kuwait Trade Union Federation, including the Kuwait Bank Workers' Union and the Kuwait Airways Workers' Union.
