= Sheikh Jaber Al-Ahmad Al-Sabah Causeway =

Sheikh Jaber Al-Ahmad Al-Sabah Causeway جسر الشيخ جابر الأحمد الصباح
- Coordinates: 29.3765017°N 47.8246437°E
- Carries: Motor vehicles
- Crosses: Kuwait Bay
- Locale: Kuwait City and Northern Kuwait (including Subiya and Bubiyan Island)
- Owner: Ministry of Public Works
- Website: sheikhjabercauseway.com

Characteristics
- Design: Beam bridge
- Material: Concrete and steel
- Total length: Combined length of 48.5 km (30.1 mi); Main link is 36 km (22 mi) and Doha Link is 12 km (7.5 mi)
- Height: 151 m (495 ft) (max pylon above ground)
- No. of lanes: 6 lanes of traffic, 2 emergency lanes

History
- Designer: Systra
- Constructed by: Hyundai Engineering & Construction
- Construction start: 3 November 2013; 11 years ago
- Construction end: 1 May 2019; 6 years ago
- Construction cost: US$ 3.6 billion
- Inaugurated: 1 May 2019; 6 years ago

Statistics
- Toll: None

The Sheikh Jaber Al-Ahmad Al-Sabah Causeway (Arabic: جسر الشيخ جابر الأحمد الصباح) is a causeway in Kuwait that spans the Bay of Kuwait in two directions and comprises two links: the Main Link, which connects Kuwait City with northern Kuwait (including Subiya and Bubiyan Island); and a Doha Link, which connects Kuwait City with Doha district. It crosses two artificial islands (Bay Island North and Bay Island South). The causeway opened on May 1, 2019. It is part of Kuwait Vision 2035.

The causeway is named after Sheikh Jaber Al-Sabah, the previous Emir of Kuwait. It was considered one of the largest and most challenging transport infrastructure projects in Kuwait and the Middle East. The Main Link is the 4th longest road bridge in the world at 36.14 km. The overall causeway consists of two bridges. Both bridges have a combined length of 48.5 kilometers.

== History ==
Under China's Belt and Road Initiative, the causeway is part of the first phase of the Silk City project. Construction began on 3 November 2013 at a cost of approximately US$3 billion, the Sheikh Jaber Al-Ahmad Al-Sabah Causeway belongs to a series of projects being pursued by Kuwait to develop and diversify its economy and reduce its reliance on oil and gas. This push to diversify is similar to those being pursued by Saudi Arabia and other countries in the region. The project is part of Kuwait Vision 2035, and is named after the 13th Emir of Kuwait to commemorate his leadership.

The overall aim of the project is to reduce the travel distance between Kuwait City and Silk City from 104 km to 36 km, which will cut the journey time from 90 minutes at present to less than 30 minutes. Building the causeway will provide a new strategic highway route that will help planned development work located to the north of Kuwait City, as it will connect Shuwaikh Port with the Subiya New Town Development (Silk City). And it will help to integrate the northern areas of the country with the more densely populated central and southern regions, while also helping lower traffic congestion in the surrounding roads.

== Design ==
The bridge's structural design is based on designs from the American Association of State Highways and Transportation Officials. The prominent feature of the Main Link is the iconic pylon for the cable-stayed bridge that is inspired by the conventional sailboat, a traditional and historic theme of Kuwait. The pylon stands at approximately 151 meters, which is about the same height as that of the prominent Kuwait Towers.

Originally, the causeway project was conceived as one project (Main Link and Doha Link), but, in order to expedite the completion of the works, the project was tendered in two contracts: Main Link (36.14 km) and Doha link (12.4 km). The causeway project witnessed the participation and collaboration of major engineering, design, and contracting firms from around the world, including the US, France, Hong Kong, South Korea, Germany, Italy, and Austria; of course in addition to the Dar offices in Beirut and Cairo. Major companies such as Hyundai Engineering and Construction, G.S. Engineering & Construction, Systra, AECOM, T.Y. Lin International, Tony Gee & Partners, Trevi, and Fugro, as well as suppliers like Hyundai Steel, Jenoptik, Swarco, and Solari also played major parts.

An essential aspect of the bridge, which was tackled at the commencement of the work, was the environmental risks involved, what with the bridge passing through existing natural habitats. From the outset of construction, there was a strong effort to minimise any interference or damage to the flora/ fauna and the sea environment as a whole, whether temporarily during construction or permanently. Green Tiger Shrimps that are famous residents of the Kuwait Bay were protected with the establishment of new vegetation habitats where artificial reefs were installed away from the bridge construction zones. This effort was very successful as the involved parties were able to see the new shrimp habitats taking place away from the bridge location, and shrimps were reproduced in abundant capacities.

== See also ==
- Madinat al-Hareer
- Al Mutlaa City
- Mubarak Al Kabeer Port
- Kuwait National Cultural District
