= Kuwait Space Rocket =

Kuwait Space Rocket (KSR)
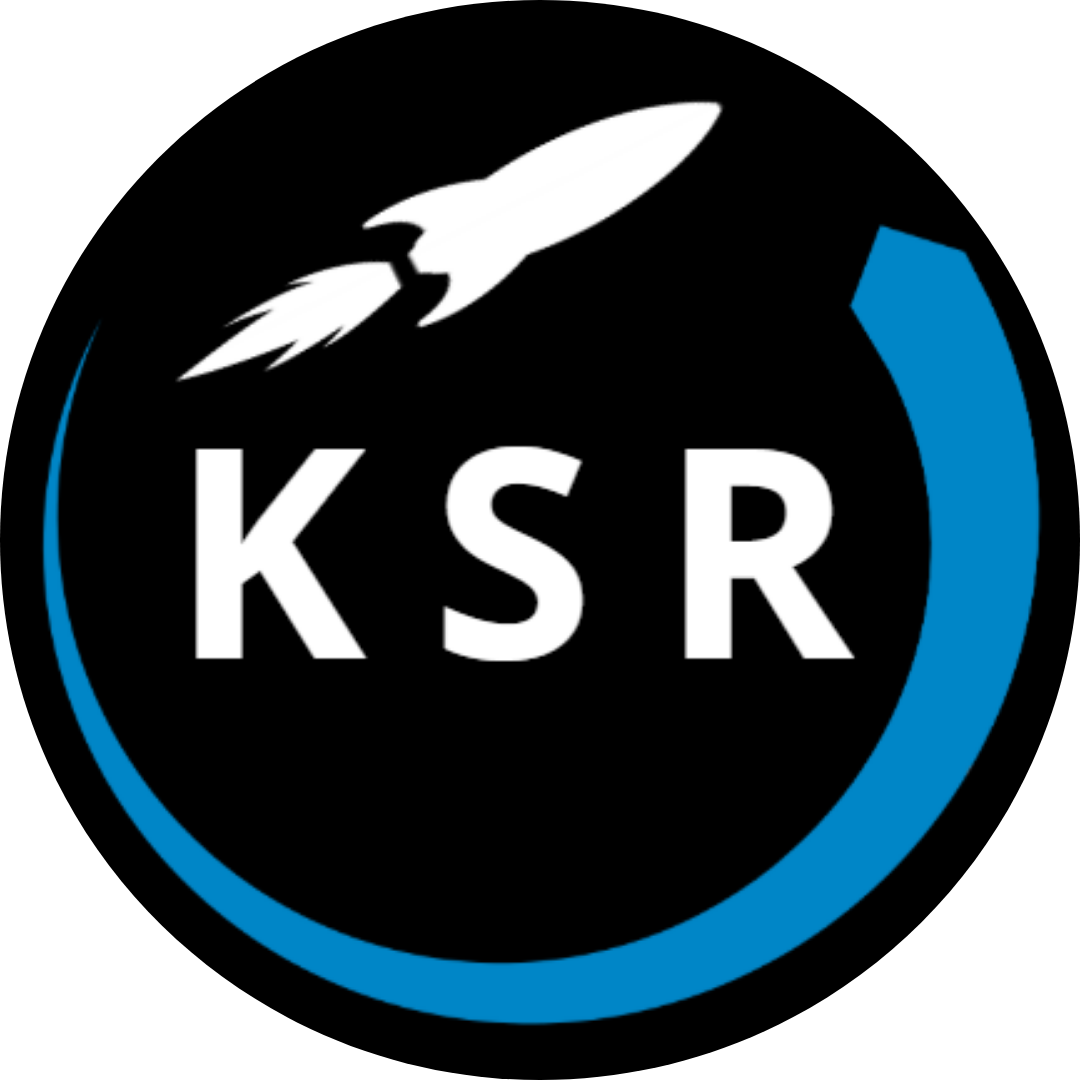
- Company type: Research group
- Industry: Aerospace
- Founded: January 2018
- Founder: Naser Ashknani
- Members: Naser Ashknani, Sulieman Alfuhaid, Hassan Almutawaa, Hassan Shamsaldeen
- Website: www.kuwaitspacerocket.com

The Kuwait Space Rocket (KSR), is a Kuwaiti project to build and launch the first suborbital liquid bi-propellant rocket in Arabia. The project is intended to be the first step towards starting a space industry in the country and a launch service provider in the GCC region. The project is divided into two phases with two separate vehicles. An initial testing phase with KSR-1 as a test vehicle capable of reaching an altitude of 8 km (5.0 mi) and a more expansive suborbital test phase with the KSR-2 planned to fly to an altitude of 100 km (62 mi). in May 16 Ambition-1 launched but had a malfunction with the parachute and crashed in free fall.

== History ==
The project began in January 2018 for conceptual design and planning. The team started the fabrication of KSR-1 in early 2019, and as of January 2020, KSR-1 was fully built.

== KSR-1 ==
KSR-1 is a vertically-launched single stage rocket. It uses a liquid bi-propellant rocket engine burning methanol as fuel and nitrous oxide as the oxidizer. KSR-1 is intended to be a test vehicle for the development of KSR-2, the goal of which is to reach space. As such, all the major components and technologies that are expected to be used in KSR-2 are present in KSR-1. The main components of KSR 1 are the engine—consisting of the injector, nozzle, and cooling jacket— with fuel and oxidizer tanks, a nitrogen gas tank, and various valves and pressure regulators.

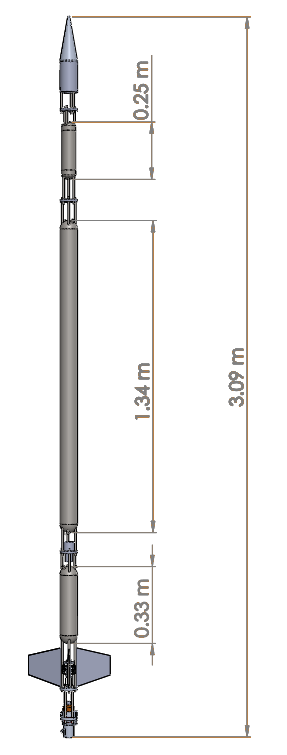
KSR-1 Vehicle Dimensions

KSR-1 Vehicle mass properties
Section	Mass (kg)
Dry mass	12
Nitrous oxide mass	3.2
Methanol mass	0.8
Total propellant mass	4
Total vehicle mass	16

KSR-1 Properties
Property	Value
Chamber pressure	3100 kPa
Exit pressure	94 kPa
Momentum thrust	520.1 N
Nozzle exit velocity	2213 m/s
Burn rate	16.8 s
Oxidizer mass flow rate	0.19 kg/s
Fuel mass flow rate	0.047 kg/s

== KSR-1 Development Process ==
=== Engine Fabrication ===
The KSR-1 engine was built locally in Kuwait and it utilizes a pressure fed cycle. The engine utilizes the nitrous not only as an oxidizer but as a cooling agent, that flows around the nozzle and back into the injector again.

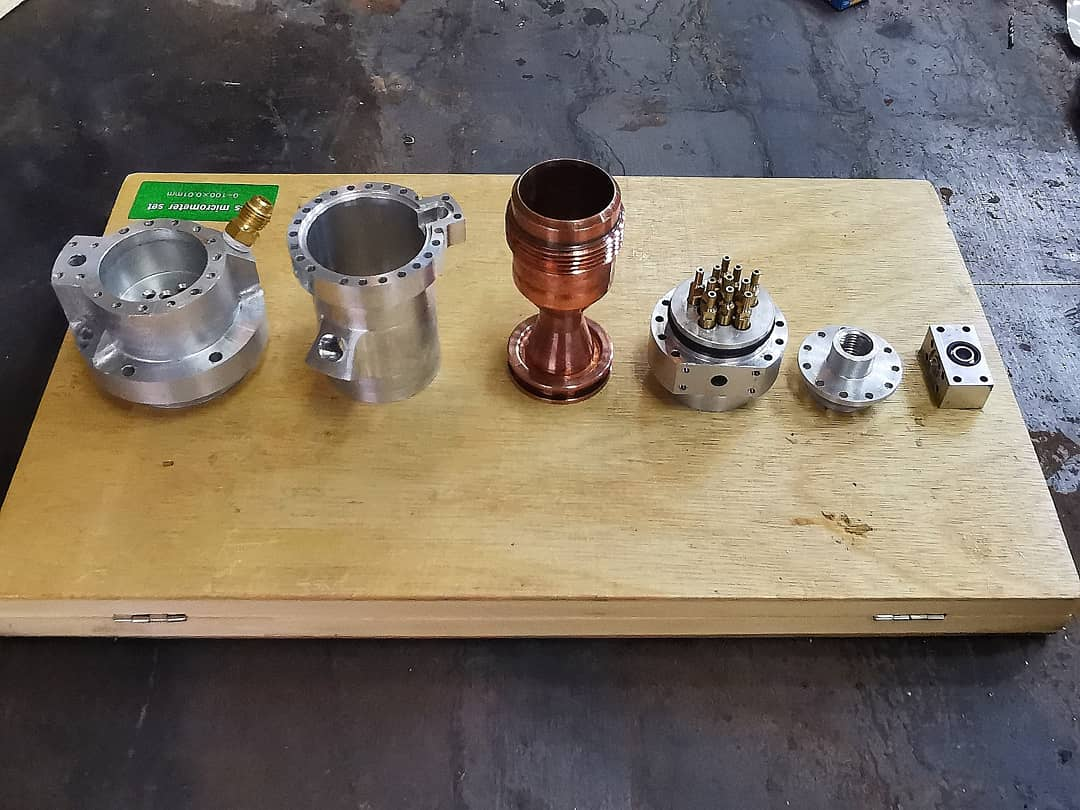
From left to right: Methanol inlet (Injector), Injector to Nozzle Connector, Copper Nozzle, Nitrous inlets (Injector), Nitrous pipe connector, Nitrous return elbow

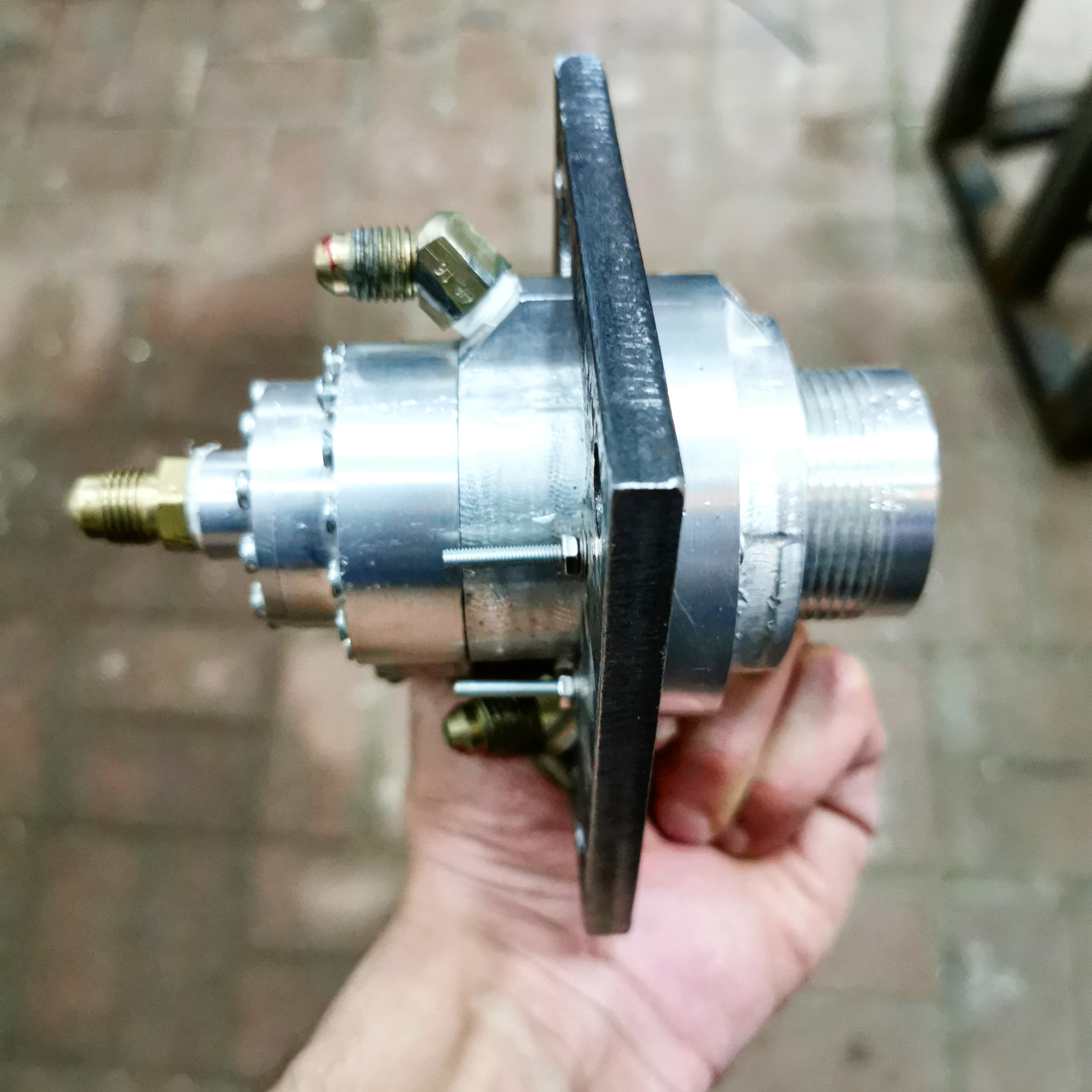
Assembled KSR-1 Injector

=== Cold Flow Testing ===
The KSR team performed a cold flow testing in October 2019 to verify the engine's flow rate and plumbing.

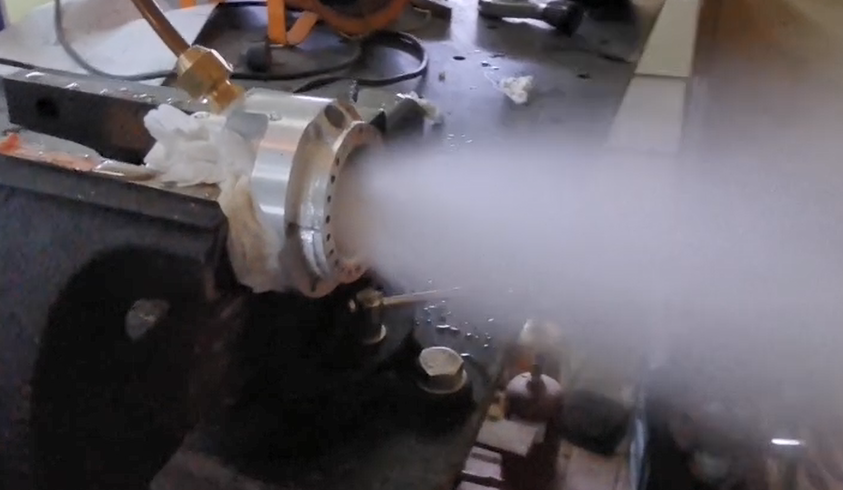
Cold Flow Test

=== Static Testing ===
KSR performed a static testing of the Injector in November 2019.

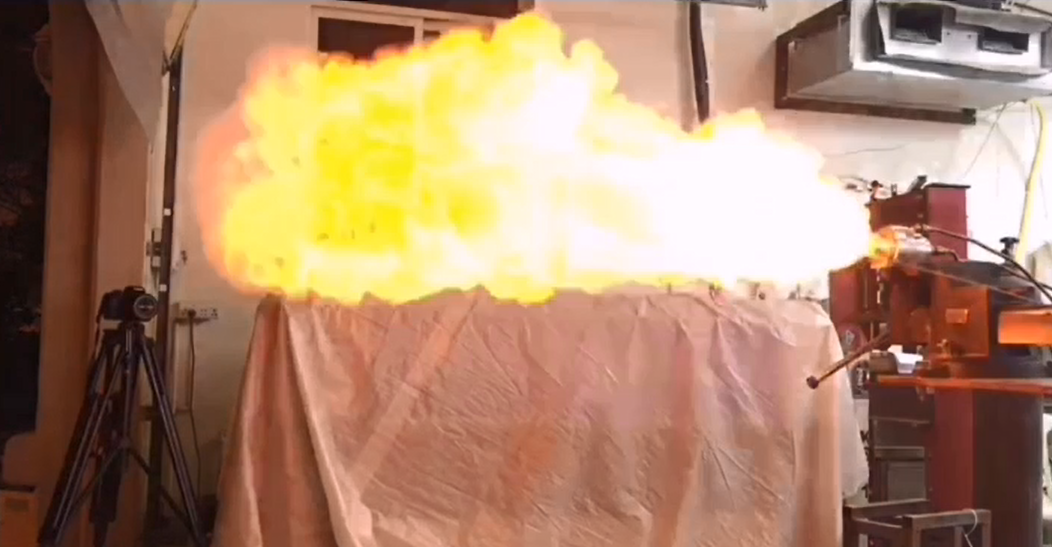
Injector Static Test

=== Structural Assembly ===
The KSR-1 was fully assembled and presented at the Kuwait Aviation Show 2020.

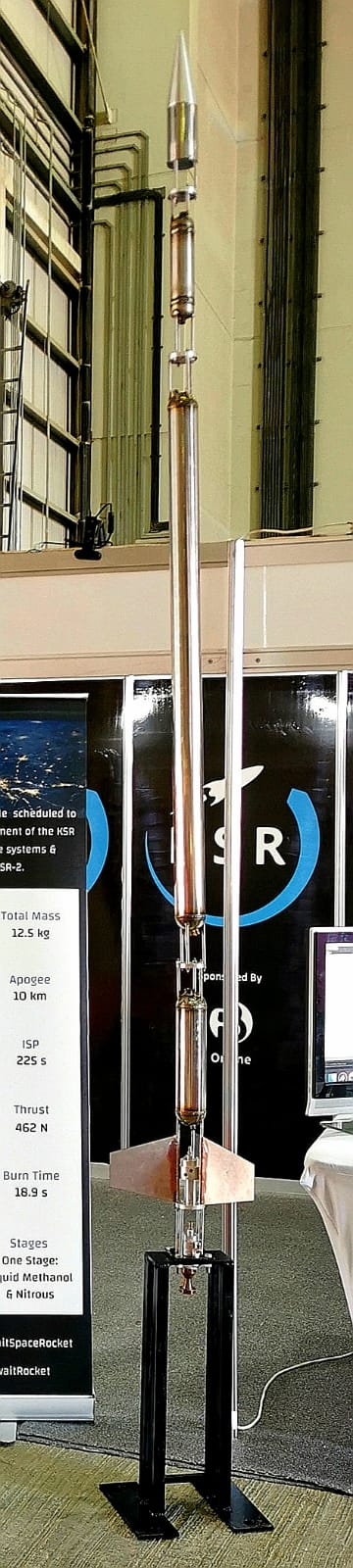
KSR-1 Rocket

== KSR-2 ==
KSR-2 is a planned liquid bi-propellant suborbital launch vehicle. It is the second installment of the KSR Rocket Family, composed of a single stage, fueled by nitrous oxide and methanol. KSR-2 will have a total length of 4 m, a diameter of 0.4 m and a total mass of 591 kg, its apogee will be around 100 km.

== See also ==
- Sub-orbital spaceflight
- Launch vehicle
