= Corruption in Kuwait =

Corruption in Kuwait is a problem resulting in political tensions in society. Kuwait's bureaucracy can be biased in favour of domestic companies. The public procurement process is susceptible to corruption, there are some ongoing investigations and trials involving government officials accused of wrongdoing in the procurement process.

Transparency International's 2025 Corruption Perceptions Index, which scored 182 countries on a scale from 0 ("highly corrupt") to 100 ("very clean"), gave Kuwait a score of 46. When ranked by score, Kuwait ranked 65th among the 180 countries in the Index, where the country ranked first is perceived to have the most honest public sector. For comparison with regional scores, the best score among Middle Eastern and North African countries (Note: Algeria, Bahrain, Egypt, Iran, Iraq, Israel, Jordan, Kuwait, Lebanon, Libya, Morocco, Oman, Qatar, Saudi Arabia, Syria, Tunisia, United Arab Emirates, and Yemen) was 69, the average was 39 and the worst was 13. For comparison with worldwide scores, the best score was 89 (ranked 1), the average was 42, and the worst was 9 (ranked 181 in a two-way tie).

== Anti-corruption efforts ==
The government has tried to reduce corruption and increase transparency in the public sector by establishing an independent anti-corruption authority and by strengthening the anti-corruption legal framework through several initiatives and efforts.

== See also ==
- Crime in Kuwait
