= Mubarak Al Kabeer Port =

- Interactive map of Mubarak Al Kabeer Port
- Location in Kuwait
- Native name: ميناء مبارك الكبير

Location
- Country: Kuwait
- Location: Bubiyan Island
- Coordinates: 29.865°N 48.318°E

Mubarak Al Kabeer Port (Arabic: ميناء مبارك الكبير) is an under construction port in Bubiyan Island, Kuwait on Khor Abdullah. The expected completion date of the port is in 2026. The port is part of China's Belt and Road Initiative.

== Background ==
Mubarak Al Kabeer Port is part of China's Belt and Road Initiative. Under China's Belt and Road Initiative, the Mubarak Al Kabeer Port is part of the first phase of the Silk City project. The port is an essential part of Kuwait Vision 2035 and will create new job opportunities in Kuwait.

Mubarak Al Kabeer Port is part of the Gulf Railway project in Kuwait.

== History ==
According to MEED, the project's contract was awarded in November 2019. The port is set to be environmentally sustainable. In September 2020, it was reported that the port is 53% complete. In March 2021, it was announced that Kuwait and Pakistan will develop linkages between Gwadar Port and Mubarak Al Kabeer Port.

In April 2021, the port's first phase was completed (4 berths). As part of Mubarak Al Kabeer Port's development, Bubiyan Island will contain power plants and substations. A 5,000-megawatt power plant has already been built in Subiya. There is a current road project connecting Mubarak Al Kabeer Port's first phase to the existing road network in Bubiyan Island. Mubarak Al Kabeer Port is among Kuwait's largest infrastructure projects in 2021. The port's fire stations are currently under development.

== Iraq-Kuwait relations ==
The port entails developing mutually beneficial economic ties with Iraq. In early 2011, the port caused tensions between Kuwait and Iraq due to its proximity to Iraq's under-construction Grand Faw Port. In September 2011, Iraq's foreign minister announced that the dispute over Mubarak Al Kabeer Port has been resolved.

In August 2019, Iraq sent a protest letter against Kuwait to the United Nations regarding the maritime area that lies beyond marker 162 in Khor Abdullah by upraising a shoal, namely Fisht al-Aych, and accusing Kuwait of making geographical changes to its maritime border.

== See also ==
- Sheikh Jaber Al-Ahmad Al-Sabah Causeway
- Al Mutlaa City
- Kuwait National Cultural District
- Sabah Al Ahmad Sea City
