= Al-Mutlaa =

City in Kuwait

Al-Mutlaa المطلاع
- Location within Kuwait
- Coordinates: 29.49°N 47.59°E
- Country: Kuwait
- District: Jahra Governorate
- Established: 2019

Government
  - Type: Public Authority for Housing Welfare

Area
  - Total: 100 km^{2} (39 sq mi)
- Time zone: UTC+3 (AST)

Al-Mutlaa (Arabic: المطلاع, romanized: Al-Mitlae) is a city in Jahra Governorate, northern Kuwait. The city spans an area of 100 square kilometers. It is the largest housing project in Kuwaiti history, ultimately intended to provide homes for 400,000 people in 12 suburbs with amenities.

== History ==
Phase one of the project involved works for more than 12,000 residential plots. The city was approximately 39% complete in May 2019.

Al-Mutlaa was one of several new cities planned by the Kuwaiti government, alongside Saad Al-Abdullah and Sabah Al-Ahmad. On 29 March 2023, A French company by the name of Egis Group has taken management over the construction of the city.

== See also ==
- Madinat al-Hareer
- Sheikh Jaber Al-Ahmad Al-Sabah Causeway
- Sabah Al Ahmad Sea City
- Mubarak Al Kabeer Port
- Kuwait National Cultural District
