= Khaled A. Mahdi =

Kuwaiti chemical engineer

General Secretariat of the Supreme Council for Planning and Development
- Incumbent
- Assumed office 2016
- Incumbent: Secretary-General
- Preceded by: Hashem Alrefee

Personal details
- Born: 1 January 1970 (age 56)
- Citizenship: Kuwait
- Education: PhD in chemical engineering
- Alma mater: University of Toronto; Illinois Institute of Technology; Northwestern University

Khaled A. Mahdi (Arabic: خالد مهدي; born 1 January 1970) held the position of the Secretary-General of the General Secretariat of the Supreme Council for Planning and Development (GSSCPD) of Kuwait in 2016 till 2024. He succeeded Mr. Hashem Alrefee (2014 - 2015) and Dr. Adel Alweqayan (2014 - 2007). The GSSCPD steers the long-term Kuwait National Development Plan (KNDP), part of the vision for New Kuwait by His Highness the Emir of Kuwait, Sabah Al-Ahmad Al-Jaber Al-Sabah, which "mobilizes development efforts across seven pillars with the aim of transforming Kuwait into a financial, cultural, and institutional leader in the region by 2035".

== Early life and education ==
Mahdi was born on 1 January 1970. He received his Bachelor's degree in chemical engineering from University of Toronto, Canada, and his Master's in the same field from the Illinois Institute of Technology, USA. Mahdi received his PhD in chemical engineering from Northwestern University, USA, where he specialized on applications of statistical mechanics on complex thermodynamic systems working with Professor Monica Olvera de la Cruz research group.

== Career ==
Mahdi starting his academic career working in the Water Resource Division in the Kuwait Institute for Scientific Researches before moving to Kuwait University to become Associate Professor of Chemical Engineering, where he taught 30 different courses in general engineering, chemical engineering as well as management sciences. He received Kuwait University's Best Teaching Award in 2009 among other honors and awards. Mahdi has authored or co-authored more than 75 journal articles, book chapters, conference papers, patents, and books in different fields. His primary interest is the study of modeling complex systems and process optimization. Mahdi and collaborators also established SYNERGY with Prof. Maytham Safar, Computer Engineering Department at Kuwait University. He is a senior member of the American Institute of Chemical Engineers (AIChE) and several other professional societies.

=== Supreme Council for Planning and Development ===
Under Mahdi's directorship, the Secretariat has been keen "on implementing the Sustainable Development Goals (SDGs), or the 2030 Agenda, adopted by the UN in September 2015," and have already "achieved a considerable part of the Sustainable Development Goals" for Post-2015.

A key mission of the KNDP is to create stronger integration between Kuwait's public and private sectors, and in an interview with the Oxford Business Group as part of their Kuwait 2017 report, Mahdi shared that "the government stated very clearly its intentions to transition its role in the economy from an operator to regulator, from wealth distribution to wealth creation, and to entrust the economy to the private sector." Additionally, Mahdi oversees the GSSCPD's engagement in development programming and support of the national development agenda, working with various sectors and segments of the population.

In Mahdi's own words about the implementation of the national plan, the Secretariat looks to build "a solid commercial and financial infrastructure, and this cements us as a financial and commercial hub", through projects like the Knowledge Transfer and Small and Medium Enterprises (SME) expo, The knowledge Economy Forum and the Kuwait Public Policy Center (KPPC).

=== Government and public sector work ===
Since 2016, Mahdi as served as the Secretary-General of the Supreme Council for Planning and Development in the Government of Kuwait. Prior to this appointment, he was the Assistant Secretary General for the Follow-up and Future Forecasting besides being the Acting Assistant Secretary General for Planning.

Mahdi sits in several government boards and higher committees, mainly the Public Authority for Industry (PAI), Kuwait Institute for Scientific Research (KISR), Public Authority for Civil Information (PACI), and the Public Authority for Housing and Welfare (PAHW).He is a member of the Supreme Council for Education and is on the Board of Trustees of the National Center for Education Development (NCED). He serves as member in high-level committees such as the Economic and Fiscal Reform Monitoring Committee, the Humanitarian Foreign Aid Committee, Fiscal Budgeting Framework, Kuwait Demographic Disparities Committee, the Development of Kuwait Islands Committee, the Executive Committee of the Silk City, Kuwait Master Plan 2040 Committee, Kuwait Bond Debut Roadshow, and the Kuwait University Mega Projects Committee.

He also serves other government sub-committees and leading government work groups, and has spoken extensively at national and international conferences, such as the Kuwait Housing & Residential Development Forum and Kuwait Infrastructure Week in 2017.

Mahdi chairs the Consultants Selection Committee during the period 2016-2017 and is the National Director of the Country Program Action Plan of the United Nations Development Programme in Kuwait, and currently presides over the National Committee for the Implementation of Agenda 2030.

Mahdi steers chairs the national SDGs 2030 permanent standing committee and leads the vision of the state, “New Kuwait 2035”. He established the Kuwait Public Policy Center (KPPC) and its Nudge Unit; also oversees the research centers including The National Knowledge Economy Center, the National Sustainable Development Observatory and the National Development Research Center. He also led the initiative to produce Kuwait’s first Macro-Economic Model by collaborating with Oxford Economics. He has also hosted the IPIECA’s report “the Mapping the Oil and Gas Industry to the SDGs: An Atlas”, and the World Energy Outlook 2018’s report of the IEO. Mahdi has also developed strategic partnerships with local, regional and international organizations to support knowledge sharing and development.

== Awards and honours ==
In October 2018, Dr. Khaled received the People First Leader GCC HR Award for his government services at the 6th Annual GOV HR Summit. Abu Dhabi, UAE.
