= List of islands of Kuwait =

This is a list of islands of Kuwait. Kuwait has ten islands (including one former island). They are indicated on the NASA satellite image and listed in the table in order from north to south:

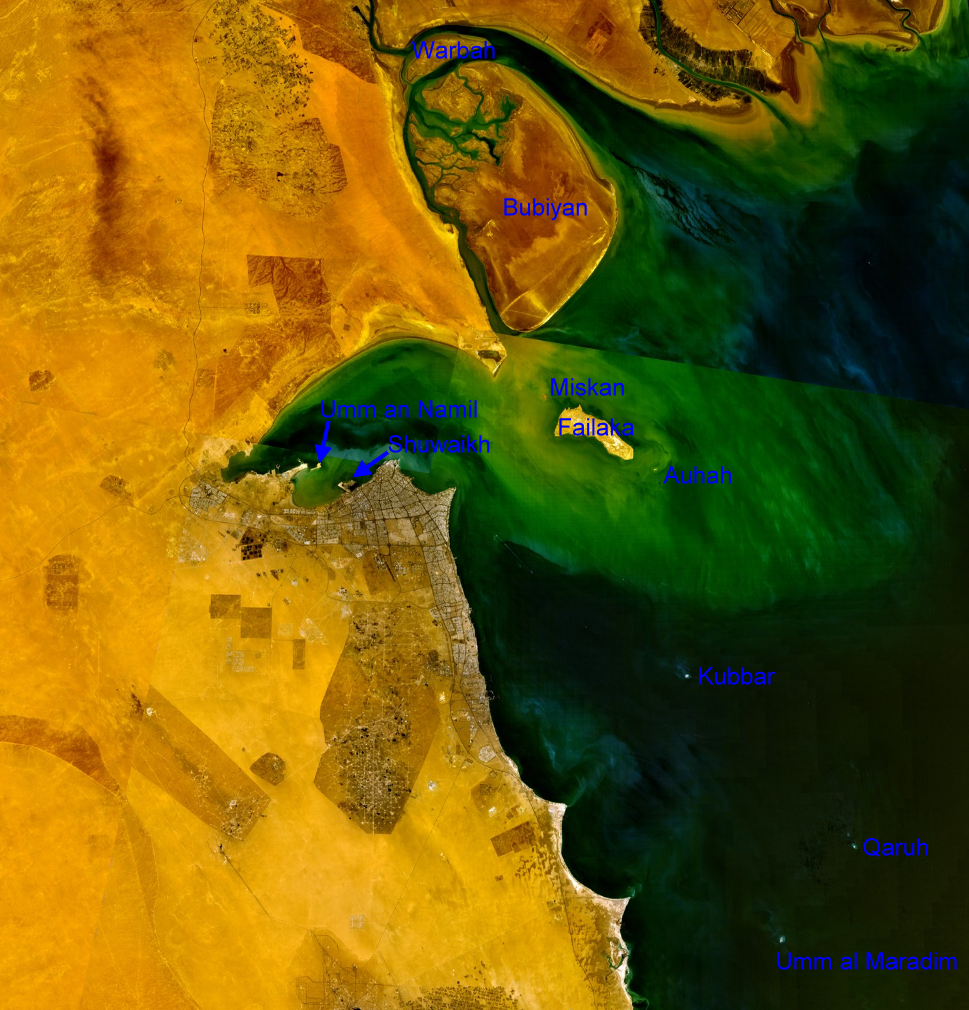
NASA Visible Color Satellite Image with islands of Kuwait

Island	Arabic	Area km^{2}	Coordinates
northern islands (Al Jahra Governorate)
Warbah Island	جَزِيرَة وَرْبَة	37	29°59′38″N 48°04′00″E
Bubiyan Island	جَزِيرَة بُوبِيَان	863	29°44′41″N 48°21′03″E
Failaka with satellite islands (Al Asimah Governorate)
Miskan Island	جَزِيرَة مِسْكَان	0.75	29°29′05″N 48°15′05″E
Failaka Island	جَزِيرَة فَيْلَكَا	20	29°26′26″N 48°20′05″E
Auhah Island	جَزِيرَة عَوْهَة	0.35	29°22′40″N 48°26′21″E
islands of Kuwait Bay (Al Asimah Governorate)
Umm an Namil Island	جَزِيرَة أُمّ اَلنَّمْل	0.569	29°22′54″N 47°52′01″E
Shuwaikh Island^{★}	جَزِيرَة قُرَيْن	0.012	29°21′16″N 47°54′35″E
southern islands (Al Ahmadi Governorate)
Kubbar Island	جَزِيرَة كُبَّر	0.11	29°04′20″N 48°29′36″E
Qaruh Island	جَزِيرَة قَارُوه	0.035	28°49′03″N 48°46′35″E
Umm al Maradim Island	جَزِيرَة أُمّ اَلْمَرَادِم	0.165	28°40′42″N 48°39′10″E
Islands of Kuwait		922
^{★} A former island after a land bridge was built to connect it to the mainland.

== See also ==
- Geography of Kuwait
- List of islands
