= Kazma =

Ancient city in Kuwait

Kazima
- Location within Kuwait Location within Near East
- 29.392881°N 47.671255°E(approximate)
- Location: Kuwait
- Region: Jahra Governorate

Kazma (Arabic: كاظمة, also written as Kazima or Kāzimah) is an area in Kuwait. It is located in Al Jahra Governorate, 40 km (25 mi) north of Kuwait City, the capital of Kuwait. It is an ancient area with a long history, known to Persians and Arabs since the Sassanid, Jahiliyyah and the early Islamic eras.

== History ==
In 633 AD, the Battle of Chains between the Sassanid Empire and Rashidun Caliphate was fought in Kuwait near Kazma. At the time, Kuwait was under the control of the Sassanid Empire. The Battle of Chains was the first battle of the Rashidun Caliphate in which the Muslim army sought to extend its frontiers.

As a result of Rashidun victory in 633 AD, the bay of Kuwait was home to the city of Kazma (also known as "Kadhima" or "Kāzimah") in the early Islamic era. Medieval Arabic sources contain multiple references to the bay of Kuwait in the early Islamic period. The city functioned as a trade port and resting place for pilgrims on their way from Iraq to Hejaz. The city was controlled by the kingdom of Al-Hirah in Iraq. In the early Islamic period, the bay of Kuwait was known for being a fertile area.

Kazma was mainly a stop for caravans coming from Persia and Mesopotamia en route to the Arabian Peninsula. The poet Al-Farazdaq was born in the city of Kazma. Al-Farazdaq is recognized as one of the greatest classical poets of the Arabs.

== See also ==
- Akkaz Island
- Failaka Island
- Umm an Namil Island
- H3 (Kuwait)
- Bahra 1
- Ikaros (Failaka Island)
- Agarum
- Subiya, Kuwait
