= Ikaros (Failaka Island) =

Ancient Greek name for Failaka Island, Kuwait

- Ἴκαρος (Greek)
- Location within Kuwait Location within the Near East
- 29°26′20″N 48°20′00″E (approximate)
- Location: Kuwait
- Region: Mesopotamia

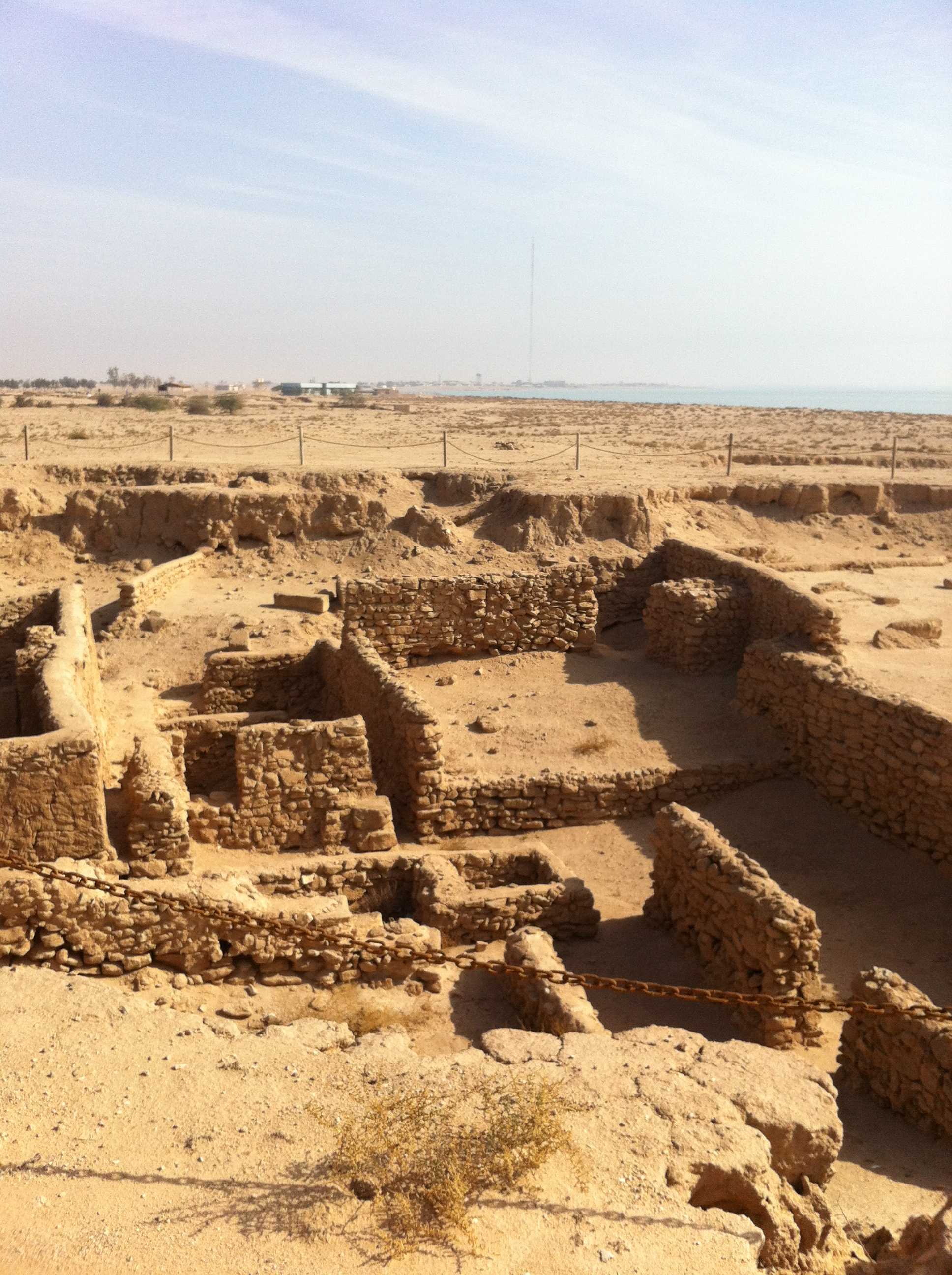
Ruins at Failaka island

Ikaros (Greek: Ἴκαρος) was the Hellenistic name for what is now the Failaka Island of Kuwait. It is located 50 kilometres (31 mi) southeast of the spot where the Tigris and Euphrates empty into the Persian Gulf. For thousands of years, the island served as a strategic point in the Persian Gulf that would enable its ruler to control the lucrative trade that passed through the area; the island has been a strategic location since the rise of the Sumerian city-state of Ur in Mesopotamia.

Having returned to Persia after his Indian campaign, an order was issued by Alexander the Great that called for the island to be named Icarus on the namesake of the Greek island in the Aegean Sea. This was likely a Hellenized version of the local name, Akar (Aramaic: ´KR), derived from the ancient Bronze-Age toponym Agarum. Another suggestion is that the name Ikaros was influenced by the local É-kara temple, dedicated to the Babylonian sun-god Shamash. That both Failaka in the Persian Gulf and Icarus in the Aegean Sea housed bull cults would have made the identification all the more tempting.

During the Hellenistic era, there was a temple dedicated to Artemis on the island; the wild animals of the island were dedicated to the goddess with a decree for their protection. Strabo wrote that there was a temple of Apollo and an oracle of Artemis (μαντεῖον Ταυροπόλου; Tauropolus). The island is also mentioned by Stephanus of Byzantium and Ptolemaeus.

Remains of the settlement include a large Hellenistic fort and two Greek temples. Failaka was also a trading post (emporion) of the Parthian kingdom of Characene.

Parts of the island are considered for inclusion in the list of UNESCO World Heritage Sites.

== See also ==
- Agarum
- Failaka Island
- Akkaz Island
- Umm an Namil Island
- H3 (Kuwait)
- Bahra 1
- Kazma
- Subiya, Kuwait
