= Kuwait Bay =

Small bay in Kuwait

Coordinates: 29°26′N 47°56′E

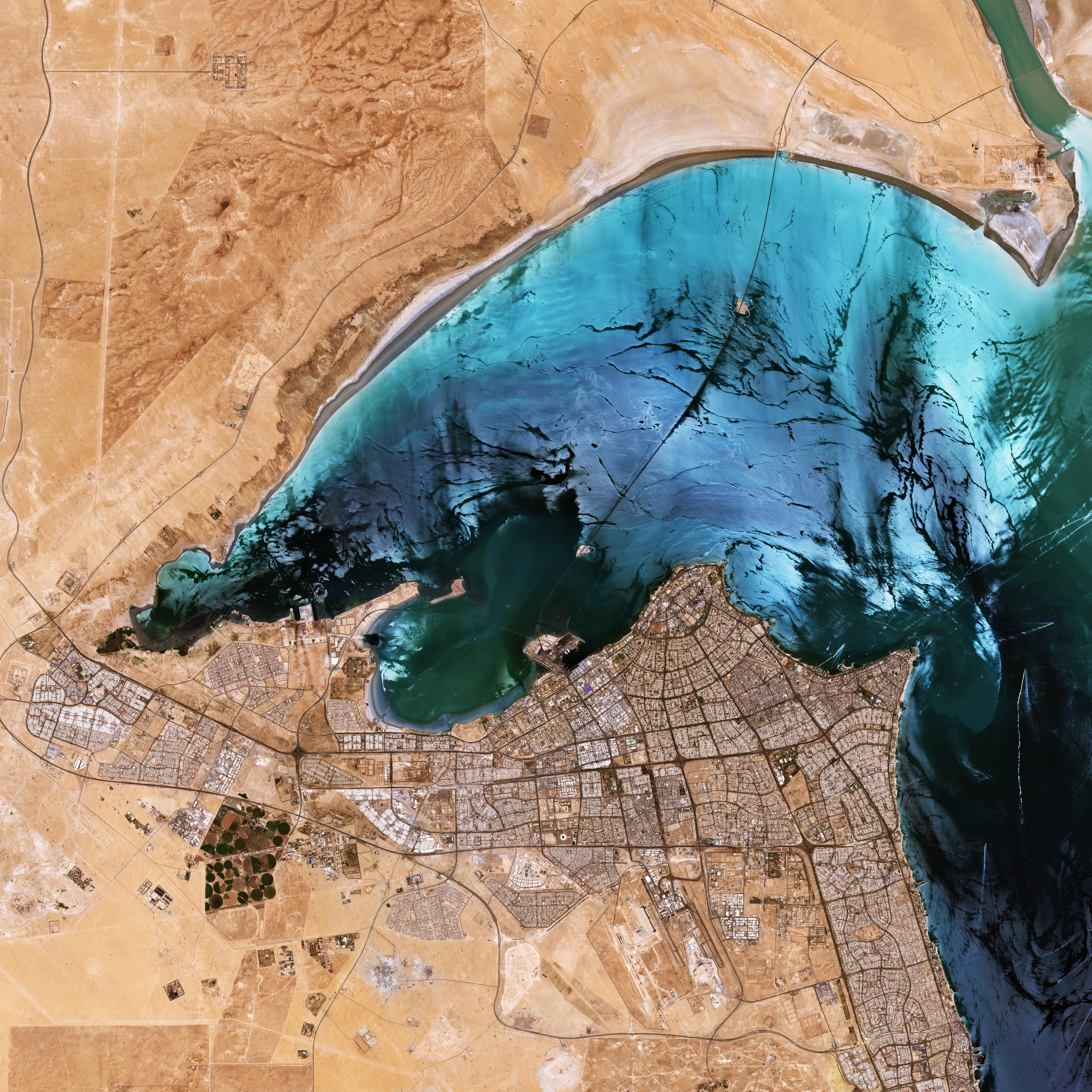
Kuwait Bay

Jōn al Kuwayt (Arabic: جون الكويت, Gulf Arabic pronunciation: /d͡ʒoːn‿ɪlkweːt/), also known as Kuwait Bay, is a bay in Kuwait. It is the head of the Persian Gulf. Kuwait City lies on a tip of the bay.

== History ==
Following the post-glacial flooding of the Persian Gulf basin, debris from the Tigris–Euphrates river formed a substantial delta, creating most of the land in present-day Kuwait and establishing the present coastlines. Historically, northern Kuwait was part of ancient Mesopotamia. One of the earliest evidence of human habitation in southern Kuwait dates back 8000 B.C. where Mesolithic tools were found in Burgan. The Neolithic inhabitants of Kuwait were among the world's earliest maritime traders. During the Ubaid period (6500 BC), Kuwait was the central site of interaction between the peoples of Mesopotamia and Neolithic Eastern Arabia, including Bahra 1 and site H3 in Subiya. One of the world's earliest reed-boats was discovered at site H3 dating back to the Ubaid period.

In 4000 BC until 2000 BC, Kuwait Bay was home to the Dilmun civilization. Dilmun's control of the bay of Kuwait included mainland Akkaz, Umm an Namil, and Failaka. At its peak in 2000 BC, the Dilmun empire controlled the trade routes from Mesopotamia to India and the Indus Valley civilization. Dilmun's commercial power began to decline after 1800 BC. Piracy flourished throughout the region during Dilmun's decline. After 600 BC, the Babylonians added Dilmun to their empire.

At the time of Alexander the Great, the mouth of the Euphrates River was located in northern Kuwait. The Euphrates river flowed directly into the Persian Gulf via Khor Subiya which was a river channel at the time. Failaka was located 15 kilometers from the mouth of the Euphrates river. By the first century BC, the Khor Subiya river channel dried out completely.

During the Achaemenid period (c. 550‒330 BC), Kuwait Bay was repopulated. There are Aramaic inscriptions that testify Achaemenid presence. In 127 BC, Kuwait was part of the Parthian Empire and the kingdom of Characene was established around Teredon in present-day Kuwait. Characene was centered in the region encompassing southern Mesopotamia, Characene coins were discovered in Akkaz, Umm an Namil, and Failaka. A busy Parthian era Characene commercial station existed in Kuwait. The earliest recorded mention of Kuwait was in 150 AD in the geographical treatise Geography by Greek scholar Ptolemy. Ptolemy mentioned the Bay of Kuwait as Hieros Kolpos (Sacer Sinus in the Latin versions).

Most of present-day Kuwait Bay is still archaeologically unexplored. According to several famous archaeologists and geologists, Kuwait was likely the original location of the Pishon River which watered the Garden of Eden. Juris Zarins argued that the Garden of Eden was situated at the head of the Persian Gulf (present-day Kuwait), where the Tigris and Euphrates Rivers run into the sea, from his research on this area using information from many different sources, including LANDSAT images from space. His suggestion about the Pishon River was supported by James A. Sauer of the American Center of Oriental Research. Sauer made an argument from geology and history that Pishon River was the now-defunct Kuwait River. With the aid of satellite photos, Farouk El-Baz traced the dry channel from Kuwait up the Wadi Al-Batin.

== See also ==
- Geography of Kuwait
- Sheikh Jaber Al-Ahmad Al-Sabah Causeway
