= Qaru =

Qaru or Qarū, Qaruh, Qarūh, from Arabic قرو and قاروه, may refer to:

== Places ==
- Qaruh Island, one of Kuwait's 9 islands.
- Qaru, Yemen, a village in Yemen.
