= Umm an Namil Island =

Island in Kuwait

Umm al Namil
- Location within Kuwait Location within Near East
- 29°22′54″N 47°52′01″E (approximate)
- Location: Kuwait
- Region: Persian Gulf

Jazirat Umm an Namil Lighthouse
- Location: Umm an Namil Island, Kuwait
- Coordinates: 29°23′14″N 47°52′16″E

Tower
- Foundation: concrete base
- Construction: metal skeletal tower
- Height: 16 m (52 ft)
- Shape: square pyramidal tower with balcony and lantern
- Markings: red and white horizontal bands tower
- Power source: solar power
- Operator: Kuwait Port Authority

Light
- Focal height: 17 m (56 ft)
- Characteristic: Fl W 10s

Umm al Namil (Arabic: جزيرة ام النمل, lit. 'mother of ants') is an island belonging to Kuwait, located within Kuwait Bay, in Persian Gulf. The island is at shortest, 600 metres (2,000 feet) away from the Kuwaiti mainland.

The island is known to be the site of several archeological finds, mainly from the ancient Islamic era, Dilmun civilization, Hellenistic (including Seleucid), and the Bronze Age.

== See also ==
- Akkaz Island
- Failaka Island
- H3 (Kuwait)
- Bahra 1
- Ikaros (Failaka Island)
- Kazma
- Agarum
- Subiya, Kuwait
- List of lighthouses in Kuwait
