= Kubbar Island =

Jazirat Kubbar Lighthouse
- Location: Kubbar Island, Kuwait
- Coordinates: 29°04′18″N 48°29′36″E

Tower
- Foundation: concrete base
- Construction: metal skeletal tower
- Height: 25 m (82 ft)
- Shape: square pyramidal tower with balcony and lantern
- Markings: black and white horizontal bands tower
- Power source: solar power
- Operator: Middle East Navigation Aids Service

Light
- Focal height: 28 m (92 ft)
- Range: 18 nmi (33 km; 21 mi)
- Characteristic: Fl(2) W 10s

Kubbar (Arabic: جزيرة كبر) is a sandy island of Kuwait in the Persian Gulf, covered with shrub. It is located roughly 30 kilometers off the southern coast of Kuwait and 29 kilometres off the coast of Failaka. The island is nearly circular, with a diameter of 370 to 380 meters, corresponding to an area of about 11 ha.

== History ==
Around six Iraqi soldiers killed in the Gulf War of 1991 lie buried on the island. Their graves are marked discreetly, in the Islamic manner.

== Environment ==
Kubbar is sandy, with low coasts and sparsely vegetated. It is surrounded by coral reefs and is therefore popular with scuba divers. The coral reefs in this region are included in the regular ongoing voluntary work of the renowned award-winning Kuwait Dive Team (KDT), a group voted by the United Nations as the best in the world.

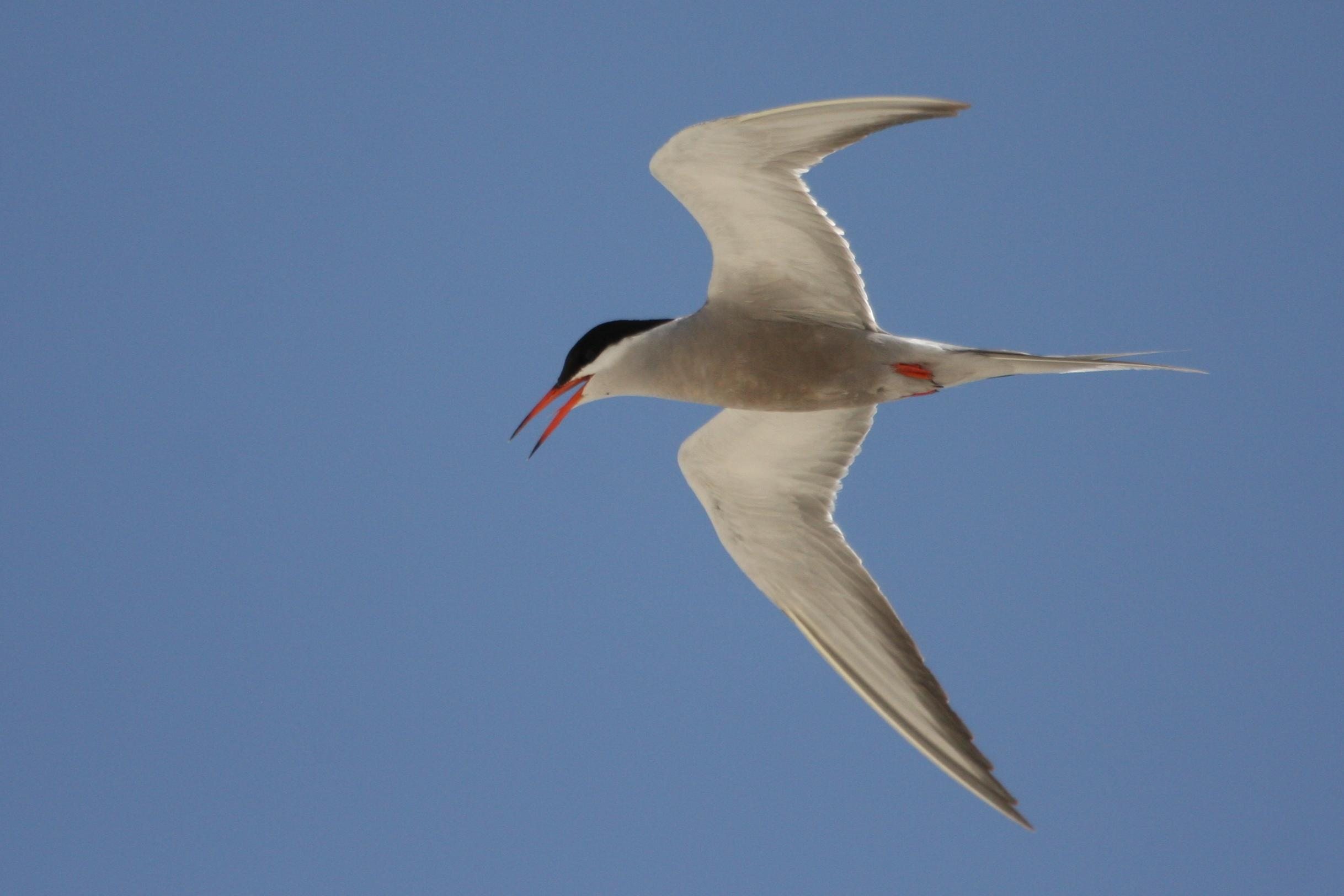
White-cheeked terns nest on the island

=== Important Bird Areas ===
The island has been recognised as an Important Bird Area (IBA) by BirdLife International because it supports a breeding colony of white-cheeked terns.

== See also ==
- List of lighthouses in Kuwait
