= List of lighthouses in Kuwait =

This is a list of lighthouses in Kuwait.

== Lighthouses ==
Name	Image	Year built	Location & coordinates	Class of light	Focal height	NGA number	Admiralty number	Range nml
Ash-Shuwaykh Lighthouse		n/a	Ash-Shuwaykh; 29°21′30.0″N 47°55′53.8″E	Fl (2) W 15s.	n/a	n/a	D7599.1	n/a
Ash-Shuaybah Port Control Lighthouse	Image	n/a	Al Ahmadi; 29°02′34.0″N 48°09′58.8″E	Fl (3) W 15s.	n/a	n/a	D7581.8	n/a
Jazirat Kubbar Lighthouse		n/a	Kubbar Island; 29°04′18.0″N 48°29′36.0″E	Fl (2) 10s.	28 metres (92 ft)	29176	D7573	18
Jazirat Auhah Lighthouse	Image	n/a	Auhah Island; 29°22′38.9″N 48°26′24.1″E	Fl (3) W 10s.	23 metres (75 ft)	29184	D7588	5
Jazirat Maskan Lighthouse	Image	1918	Miskan Island; 29°29′04.2″N 48°15′04.0″E	Q (4) W 30s.	11 metres (36 ft)	29244	D7603	10
Jazirat Qaruh Lighthouse		n/a	Qaruh Island; 28°49′03.0″N 48°46′35.0″E	Fl W 10s.	14 metres (46 ft)	29316	D7569	5
Jazirat Umm al Maradim Lighthouse		n/a	Umm al Maradim Island; 28°40′46.5″N 48°39′10.1″E	Fl (2) W 15s.	23 metres (75 ft)	29324	D7568	10
Jazirat Umm an Namil Lighthouse		n/a	Umm an Namil Island; 29°23′14.3″N 47°52′16.3″E	Fl W 10s.	17 metres (56 ft)	n/a	D7601.8	n/a
Mina Ad Dawhah Lighthouse		n/a	Al Jahra; 29°22′48.8″N 47°47′57.9″E	Fl (3) W 20s.	23 metres (75 ft)	29211	D7602.9	15
Ras Ajuza Lighthouse	Image	n/a	Madīnat al-Kuwayt; 29°23′30.4″N 47°59′51.8″E	Mo (KHC) G 30s.	30 metres (98 ft)	29216	D7594	10
Ras al Ard Lighthouse		n/a	Salmiya; 29°21′07.3″N 48°06′02.6″E	Fl W 5s.	26 metres (85 ft)	29220	D7592	16

== See also ==
- Lists of lighthouses and lightvessels
