= Miskan Island =

Jazirat Maskan Lighthouse
- Location: Miskan Island, Kuwait
- Coordinates: 29°29′04″N 48°15′04″E

Tower
- Construction: concrete (foundation), metal (tower)
- Height: 11 m (36 ft)
- Shape: square
- Markings: black
- Power source: solar power
- Operator: Kuwait Port Authority

Light
- Focal height: 10 m (33 ft)
- Range: 10 nmi (19 km; 12 mi)
- Characteristic: Q(4) W 30s

Miskan Island (Arabic: مسكان) is a small, uninhabited island in the Persian Gulf off Kuwait. It is to the south of Bubiyan Island. It is about 1.2 kilometers long and 800 meters wide (area about 0.75 km^{2}). The distance between it and Failaka Island, which lies to the south, is approximately 3.2 kilometers. The distance between Miskan and the nearest part of mainland Kuwait is about 24 kilometers. Miskan Island is devoid of any vital activity save a lighthouse managed by Ibrahem Bu-Rashid who lived in the island along with his family to guide ships sailing in the Persian Gulf at night. This island is important because it is a link in a chain of islands along Kuwait's coastline from north to south, which provide Kuwait with a defensive frontline.

There is an active lighthouse on the island.

Early to late Islamic settlements were discovered in Miskan.

== See also ==
- List of lighthouses in Kuwait
- History of Kuwait
