= Auhah Island =

Jazirat Auhah Lighthouse
- Location: Kuwait
- Coordinates: 29°22′39″N 48°26′24″E

Tower
- Foundation: concrete base
- Construction: metal skeletal tower
- Height: 20 m (66 ft)
- Shape: square pyramidal tower with balcony and lantern
- Markings: black and white horizontal bands tower
- Power source: solar power
- Operator: Middle East Navigation Aids Service

Light
- Focal height: 23 m (75 ft)
- Range: 5 nmi (9.3 km; 5.8 mi)
- Characteristic: Fl(3) W 10s

Auhah Island is a small island belonging to Kuwait. It is 800 metres (2,625 ft) long by 540 metres (1,772 ft) wide, which corresponds to an area of about 34 hectares (84 acres), and is located 4 km (2 mi) south-east of Failaka Island, and 33 km (21 mi) from Salmiya on the mainland. Apart from a lighthouse and a small heliport, the island is uninhabited.

== See also ==
- List of lighthouses in Kuwait
