= Al-Farazdaq =

Arab poet (c. 641-728/30)

al-Farazdaq
- الفرزدق
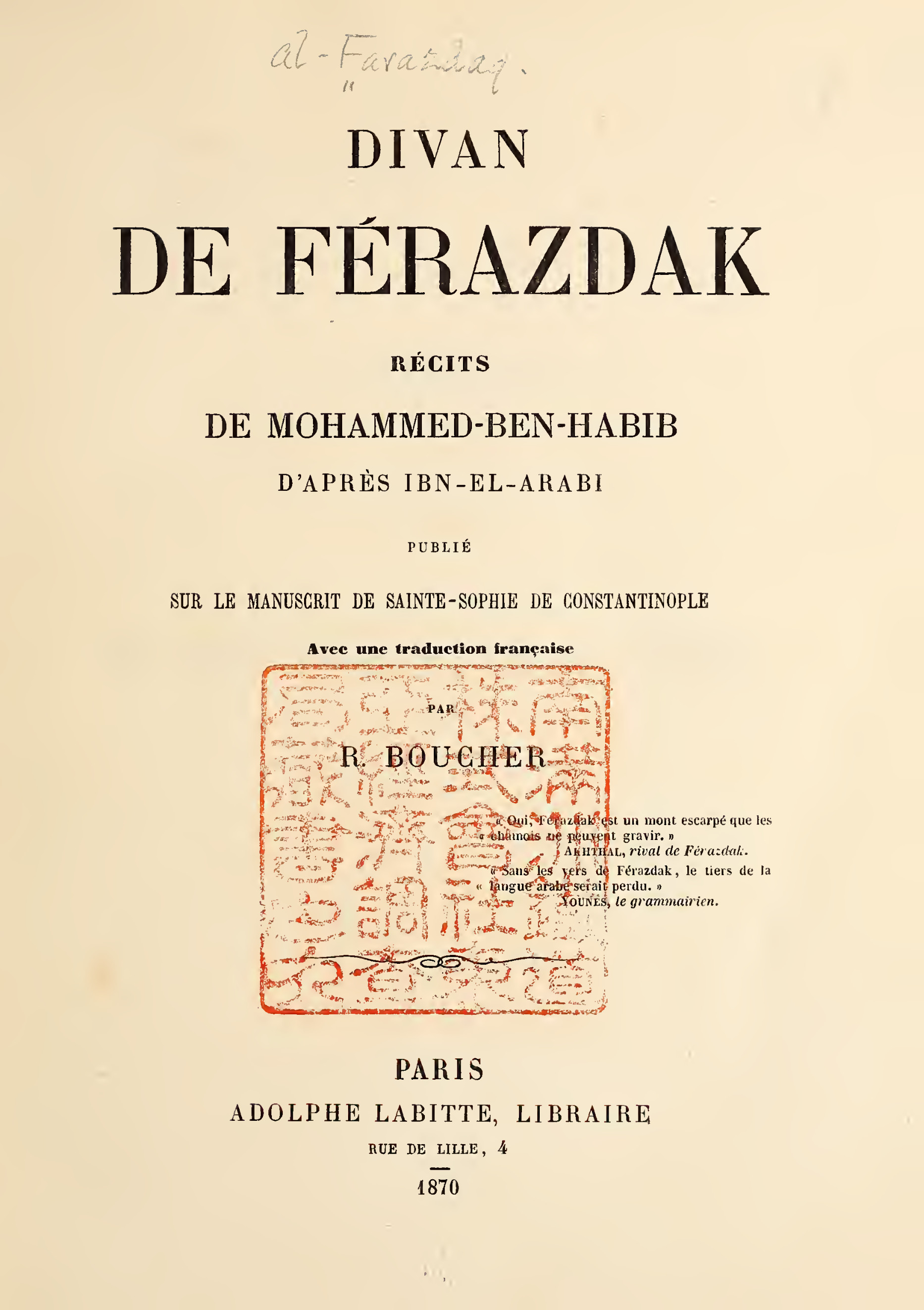
- The Diwan of al-Farazdaq
- Born: 641 AD/20 AH; Kazma (modern day Kuwait)
- Died: 728-730 AD/110-112 AH (aged 87-89); Unknown, perhaps Basra (Iraq) or Kazma
- Other name: Hammam ibn Ghalib al-Tamimi
- Occupations: Poet, Orator
- Notable work: Poem on the entry of Zayn al-Abidin into the Haram of the Kaaba
- Spouse: Nawar

Hammam ibn Ghalib al-Tamimi (Arabic: همام بن غالب; born 641 AD/20 AH died 728–730 AD/110-112 AH), more commonly known as al-Farazdaq (الفرزدق) or Abu Firas (ابو فراس), was a 7th-century Arab poet and orator who was born during the caliphate of Umar and flourished during the Umayyad Caliphate. He had a great impact on the Arabic language and it is said that “If it were not for al-Farazdaq’s poetry, a third of the Arab language would not have been.”

Born in Kazma to nobility, he was a member of Darim, one of the most respected tribes of the Bani Tamim; his mother was from the tribe of Dabba. His grandfather Saasa was a North Arabian Bedouin of great reputation – his father Ghalib followed the same nomadic lifestyle until the founding of Basra (636 AD/15 AH), and was famous for his generosity and hospitality. Al-Farazdaq is considered to be one of the greatest classical poets of the Arabs.

At the age of 15, Farazdaq was well known as a poet, and though for a short time on the advice of the Caliph Ali to devote his time to the study of the Qur'an, he later returned to making verse. He devoted his talent largely to satire and attacked the Bani Nahshal and the Bani Fuqaim. When Ziyad, a member of the latter tribe, became governor of Basra in 669, the poet was forced into exile, first to Kufa, and then, as he was still too close to Ziyad, to Medina, where he was well received by the city's Emir, Sa'id ibn al-'As. Here he remained about ten years, writing satire about tribes, but avoiding city politics.

But he lived a lavish and prodigal life, his amorous verses led to his expulsion by the Caliph Marwan. Around that time he learned of the death of Ziyad and returned to Basra, where he secured the favor of Ziyad's successor Ubaydallah ibn Ziyad. Much of his poetry was now devoted to his matrimonial affairs. He had taken advantage of his position as guardian and married his second-degree cousin Nawar against her will. She sought help in vain from the court of Basra and from various tribes. All feared the poet's satires. At last, she fled to Mecca and appealed to the political contender to the Umayyads Abdallah ibn Zubayr, who however succeeded in inducing her to consent to a confirmation of the marriage instead.

Quarrels soon arose again. Farazdaq took a second wife, and after her death a third to annoy Nawar. Finally, he consented to a divorce pronounced by Hasan al-Basri. Another subject occasioned a long series of verses, namely his feud with his rival Jarir (an Arab poet and satirist of renown, equally well known for his feud with rival poets Farazdaq and Akhtal) and Jarir's tribe, the Bani Kulaib. These poems are published as the Nakaid of Jarir and al-Farazdaq. The feud between them lasted 40 years, Jarir is supposed to have enjoyed it so much that when he received the news of Farazdaq's passing, he lost the will to live and spontaneously died thereafter.

Al-Farazdaq became an official poet at the court of Umayyad caliph al-Walid (reign. 705–715 AD/86-96 AH), to whom he dedicated a number of panegyrics.

He is most famous for the poem that he gave in Makkah when Zayn al-Abidin entered the Haram of the Kaaba which angered the Emir. The poem is considered extremely powerful and meaningful to the life of al-Farazdaq, since he was imprisoned because of it.
