= Burgan field =

Oil field in the desert of southeastern Kuwait

Burgan Field
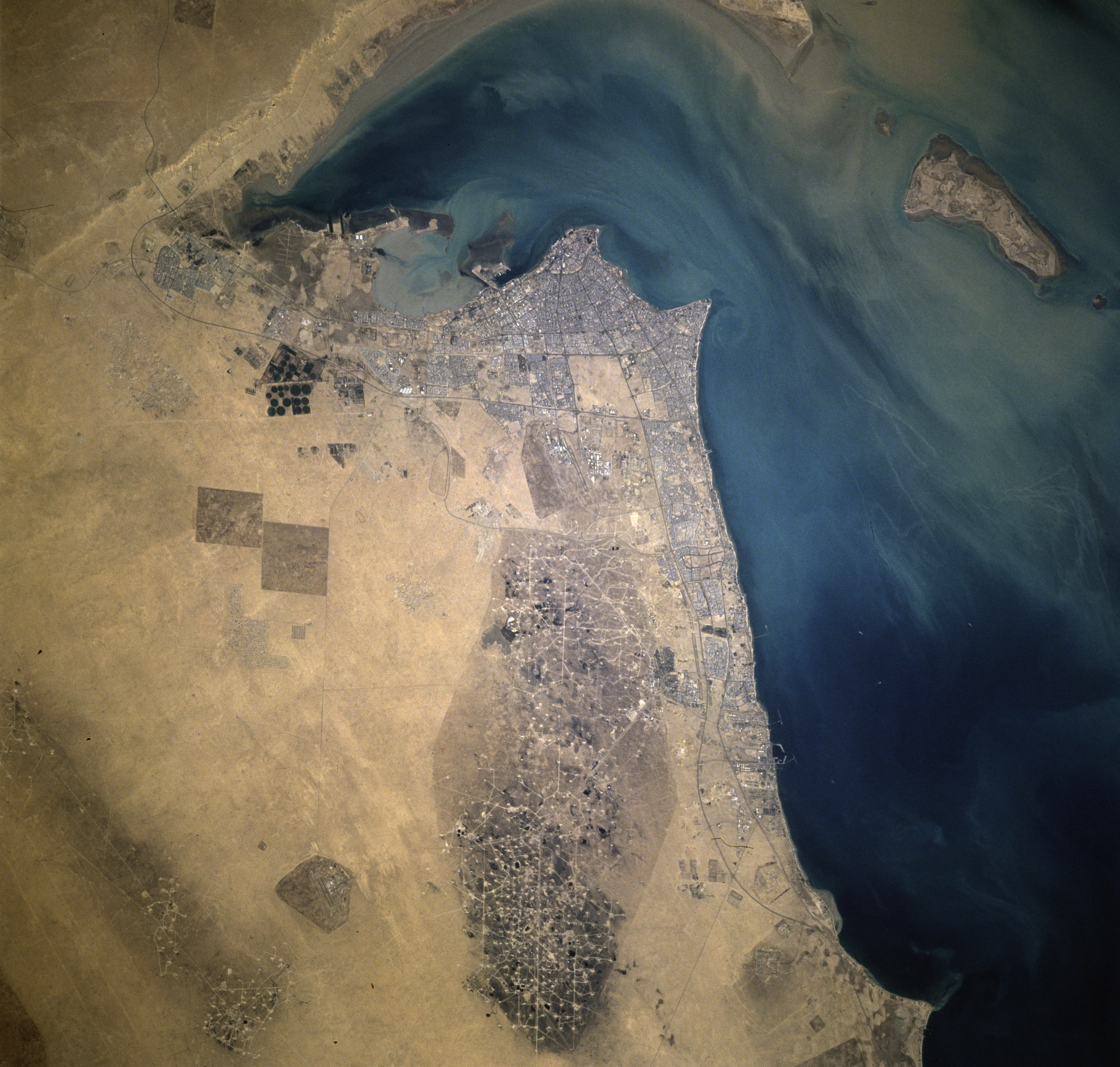
- Much of western and southern Kuwait is home to some of the largest oil fields in the world. The dark patch of land in southern Kuwait is where the Burgan oil field is located.

- Location of Burgan Field in Kuwait
- Country: Kuwait
- Region: Middle East
- Offshore/onshore: Onshore
- Coordinates: 29°06′39″N 47°58′00″E
- Operators: Kuwait Oil Company

Field history
- Discovery: 1938
- Start of production: 1946
- Peak of production: 2005
- Abandonment: N/A

Production
- Current production of oil: 1,200,000 barrels per day (~6.0×10^{7} t/a)
- Current production of gas: 550×10^{6} cu ft/d (16×10^{6} m^{3}/d)
- Peak of production (oil): 2,410,000 barrels per day (~1.20×10^{8} t/a)
- Estimated oil in place: 44,000 million barrels (~6.0×10^{9} t)
- Producing formations: Upper Cretaceous Wara

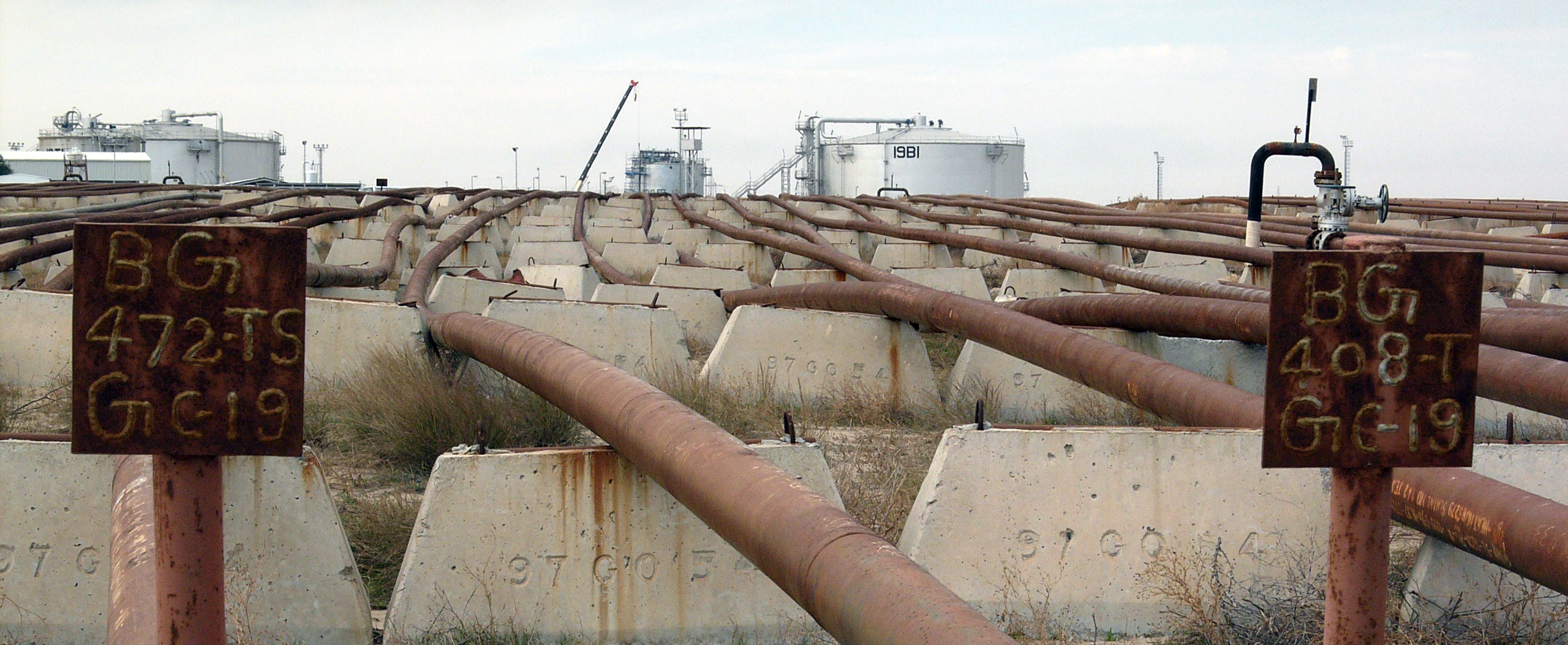
Pipelines in the Burgan oilfield

The Burgan field is an oil field situated in the desert of southeastern Kuwait. Burgan field can also refer to the Greater Burgan—a group of three closely spaced fields, which includes, in addition to Burgan field, the much smaller Magwa and Ahmadi fields. Greater Burgan is the world's largest sandstone oil field, and the second-largest overall, after Ghawar in Saudi Arabia. The Burgan field is located on the coast of the Persian Gulf, which played a huge part in the creation of this prominent reservoir formation many million years ago.

== Discovery and geology ==
A natural surface Petroleum seep above the Burgan field was known to humankind since Neolithic times, bituminous material from a reed boat discovered in As-Sabiyah/North Kuwait and dated 5000 BC have been traced back to this seep. The subsurface reservoirs of the Burgan oil field were discovered in February, 1938. The US and UK-owned Kuwait Oil Company began commercial oil production at Burgan in 1946.

The Greater Burgan, a wider area around Burgan, is the world largest sandstone (clastic) oil field with the total surface area of about 1000 km^{2}. It includes three producing subfields: Burgan itself (500 km^{2}), Magwa (180 km^{2}) and Ahmadi (140 km^{2}). The Burgan field's structure is an anticlinal dome having an elliptical shape and transected by numerous radial faults. Both Magwa and Ahmadi are located on smaller, subsidiary domes north of Burgan.

The oil is contained in the four main horizons of Cretaceous age: Wara (sandstone), Mauddud (limestone), Burgan Third Sand (3S) and Burgan Fourth Sand (4S). Burgan Third Sand is in turn subdivided into Third Sand Upper (3SU), Third Sand Middle (3SM) and Third Sand Lower (3SL). Historically the production has come mainly from the 3SM unit. By 1992 the second and third sand units had been swept by water.

== Stratigraphy ==
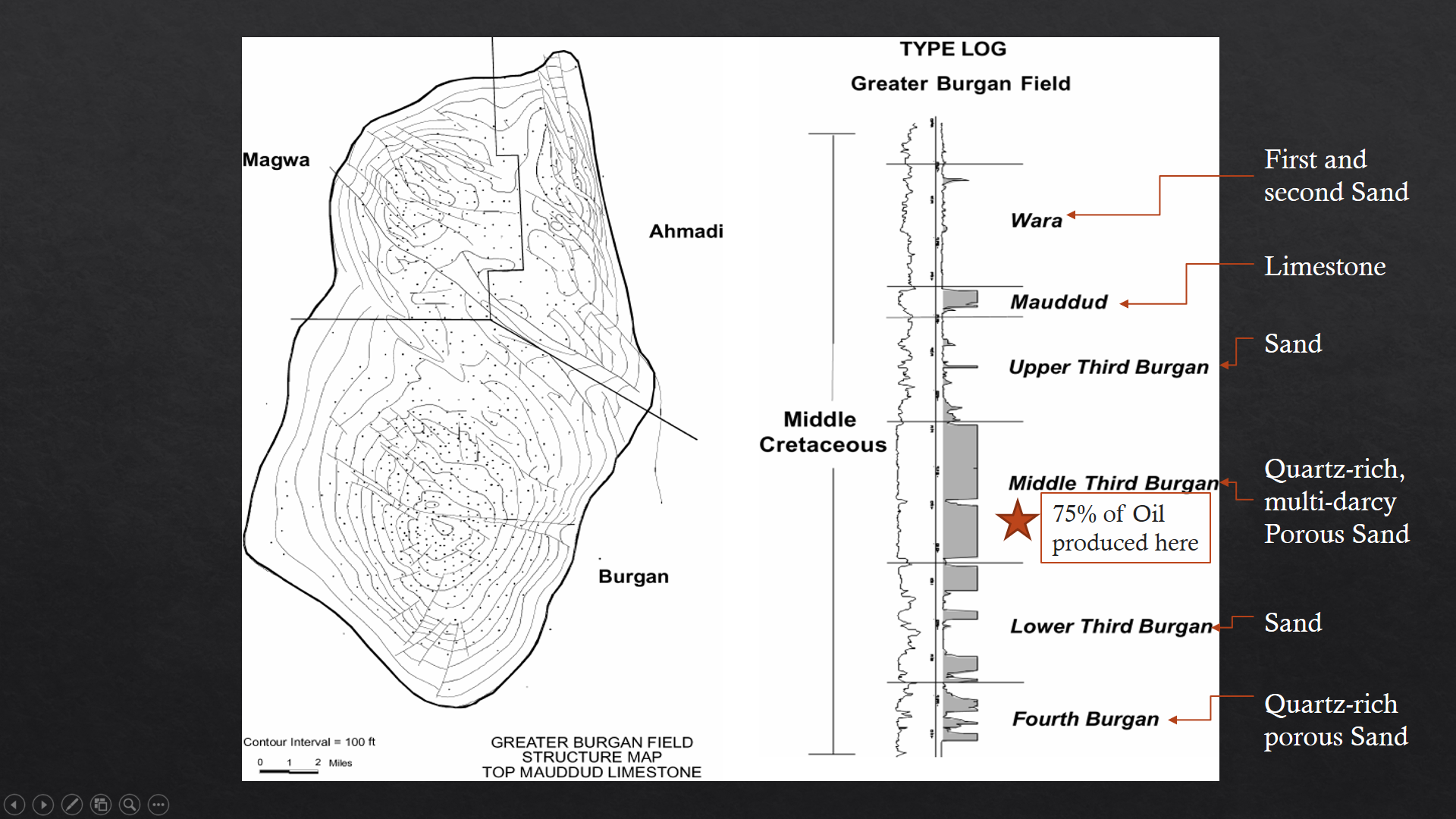

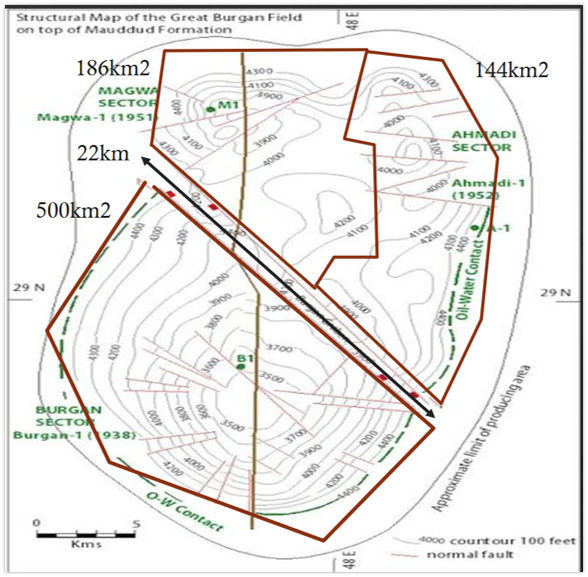

The Burgan Oil Field is made up of three main subsurface structures known as the Magwa, Ahmadi, And Burgan formation. The deeper reservoirs, namely the Lower Cretaceous Ratawi and Minagish limestones and the Jurassic Marrat Formation also contain significant oil reserves but are less substantial. The Magwa and Ahmadi formation are separated from the Burgan formation by a normal fault cutting horizontally down through the whole structure. This is known as the Burgan Graben. The role of tectonic stresses that have affected this region in Mesozoic and Cenozoic times also play a part in much of the faultings seen in the formation. Looking closer at the Burgan field the formation is made up of several radial faults that help trap the petroleum content in the formation. These faults and the Burgan graben are what cause the compartmentalization of the reservoir. This compartmentalization makes for great petroleum play and holds it in place well over a long period of time. The source rock that caps this formation is known as the Mauddad Limestone.( the above diagrams help give you a better visual on the formation as a whole)

The Paleo environment of the Greater Burgan Field suggest the field began constructing in the lower and upper Burgan sand based on a fluvial system accommodated by transgressive coastline movements over time. Following the Burgan Formation, the Mauddud Limestone Formation (source Rock) began forming. The Mauddud formation is made up of shallow marine, bioclast wackestone, grainstone, and shoal surrounded by lagoonal dolomite. Lastly, the Wara formation is created by a fluvial system exposed to bio clastic dolomite known as the wara shales. These shales were formed during the falling RSL. Finishing the Wara formation the fluvial valleys are filled with tidal estuaries caused by transgressive and RSL high stand. The formation is capped off by the Ahmadi Cap rock.

Attempts to find deeper oil plays have been made. In 1951 discovery of the Berriasian-age Minagish Oolite Limestone in Burgan was made along with the Jurassic carbonate at Magwa and both proved to be holding oil. However, production did not make way from these subsurface discoveries.

== Oil reserves, production capacity and estimated lifetime ==
"The reserves and production data for Burgan are shrouded in a cloud of secrecy, uncertainty, and controversy."

Burgan's total potential production of recoverable oil has been estimated as between 66 and 75 billion barrels, plus perhaps 70 trillion cubic ft. of natural gas. Bloomberg estimated remaining reserves of 55 billion barrels as of 2005. Cumulative production through 1996 was estimated by a consulting firm at around 28 billion barrels of oil.

Burgan's production capacity stood at 1,700,000 barrels per day (270,000 m^{3}/d) in 2005. It was the fourth most productive oilfield worldwide in 2013, per Oil Patch Asia. This was lower than it had been in the past—it reached as high as 2,400,000 barrels per day (380,000 m^{3}/d) in 1972. The actual oil production from the field in 2005 was between 1,300,000 and 1,700,000 barrels per day. The International Energy Agency then predicted an output of 1,640,000 bbl/d (261,000 m^{3}/d) in 2020 and 1,530,000 bbl/d (243,000 m^{3}/d) in 2030. In 2005, the Kuwait Oil Co. estimated a remaining life of 30 to 40 years for Burgan, at a production rate of about 1.7 million barrels a day.

In 2010 the Chief Executive of the Kuwait Oil Company said that Burgan produced half of Kuwait's oil.

The possibilities of deeper plays below the known Burgan oil & gas resource appear to be under-explored.

== 1st Gulf War ==
United States Marines approaching the burning oilfields during the Gulf War

In 1991, retreating Iraqi soldiers set Burgan Field on fire during the 1st Gulf War in a scorched earth tactic. Smoke plumes from the Greater Burgan oil field extended 50 kilometers in width on any given day, and 2.5 km thick. From satellite observations the plume appeared like a black snake in the desert that extended parallel to the Persian Gulf. The Red Adair Service and Marine Company extinguished 117 of the burning well fires, while the Canadian company Safety Boss set the pace with 180 wells extinguished. Declassified 1991 CIA documents claimed that despite the destruction there was no significant depletion of the oil reserves and drop in production capacity at Burgan field. Three gathering stations were, however, too badly damaged to repair.

The 1st Marine Division destroyed 60 Iraqi tanks in a battle that took place near the Burgan oil field.

== See also ==
- Hubbert Peak Theory
- List of oil fields
