= Qaruh Island =

Jazirat Qaruh Lighthouse
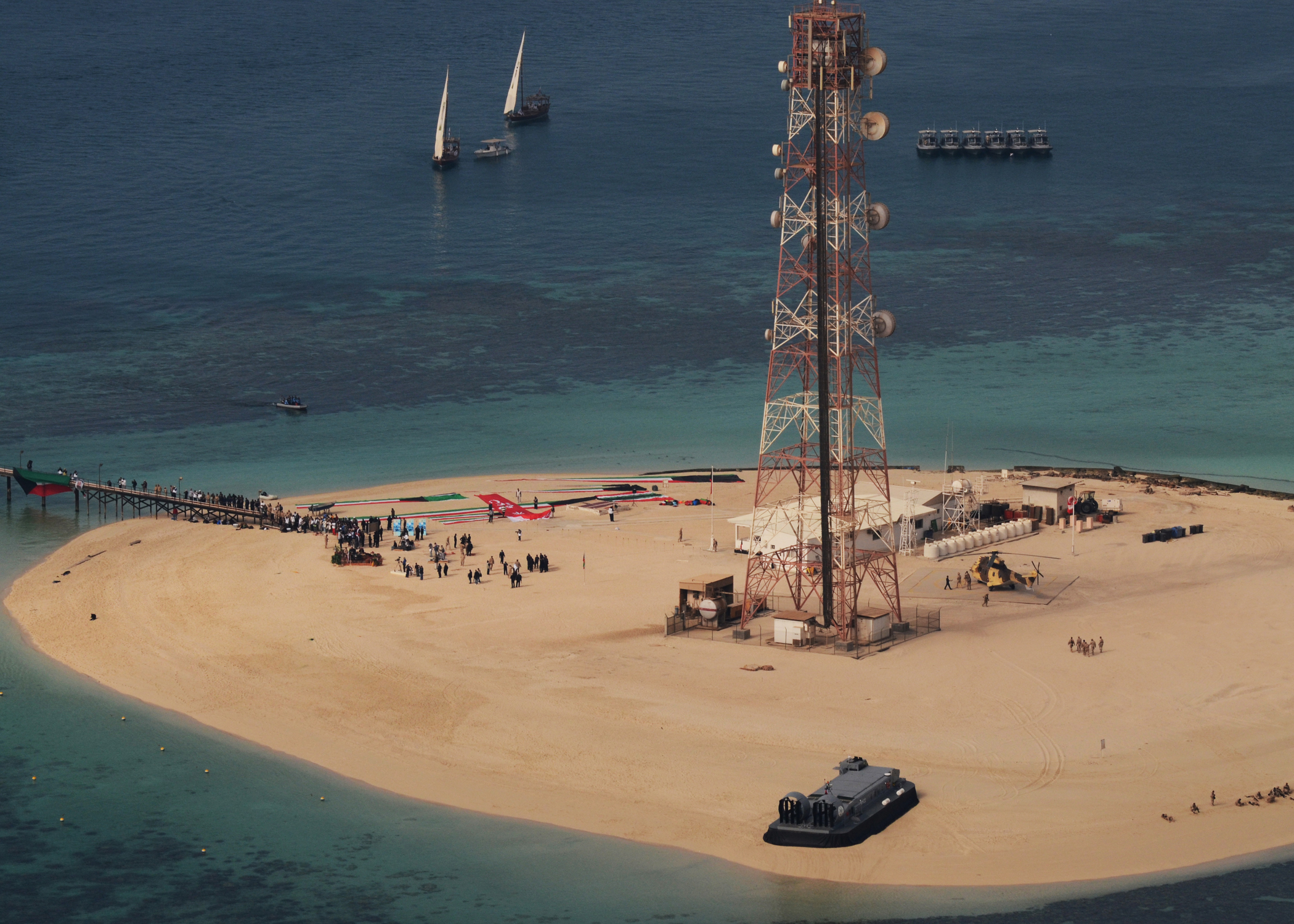
- Celebrating 20th anniversary of the liberation of Qaruh Island on 25 Jan 2011
- Location: Qaruh Island, Kuwait
- Coordinates: 28°49′03″N 48°46′36″E

Tower
- Foundation: concrete base
- Construction: metal skeletal tower
- Height: 12 m (39 ft)
- Shape: square pyramidal tower with balcony and lantern
- Markings: red and white horizontal bands tower
- Power source: solar power

Light
- Focal height: 14 m (46 ft)
- Range: 5 nmi (9.3 km; 5.8 mi)
- Characteristic: Fl W 10s

Qaruh Island (Arabic: جزيرة قاروه) is an island belonging to the state of Kuwait, which received its name from the large amounts of petroleum sediments in the area (known as Qar in Arabic). It is the smallest of the nine islands, and also the furthest island from the Kuwaiti mainland. It is located 37.5 kilometres east of the mainland coast, and 17 kilometres northeast of Umm al Maradim. The island is roughly 275 meters long by 175 meters at its widest (area about 3.5 ha. The island was also the first part of Kuwaiti soil that was liberated from Iraq during the Gulf War on January 21, 1991.

== See also ==
- List of lighthouses in Kuwait
