= Qaru, Yemen =

Coordinates: 15°55′N 48°42′E

Qaru
- Interactive map of Qaru
- Country: Yemen
- Governorate: Hadhramaut Governorate
- Time zone: UTC+3 (Yemen Standard Time)

Qaru is a village that is found in eastern Yemen. It is located in the Hadhramaut Governorate.
