= Failaka Island =

Kuwaiti island in the Persian Gulf

Native name: جزيرة فيلچا
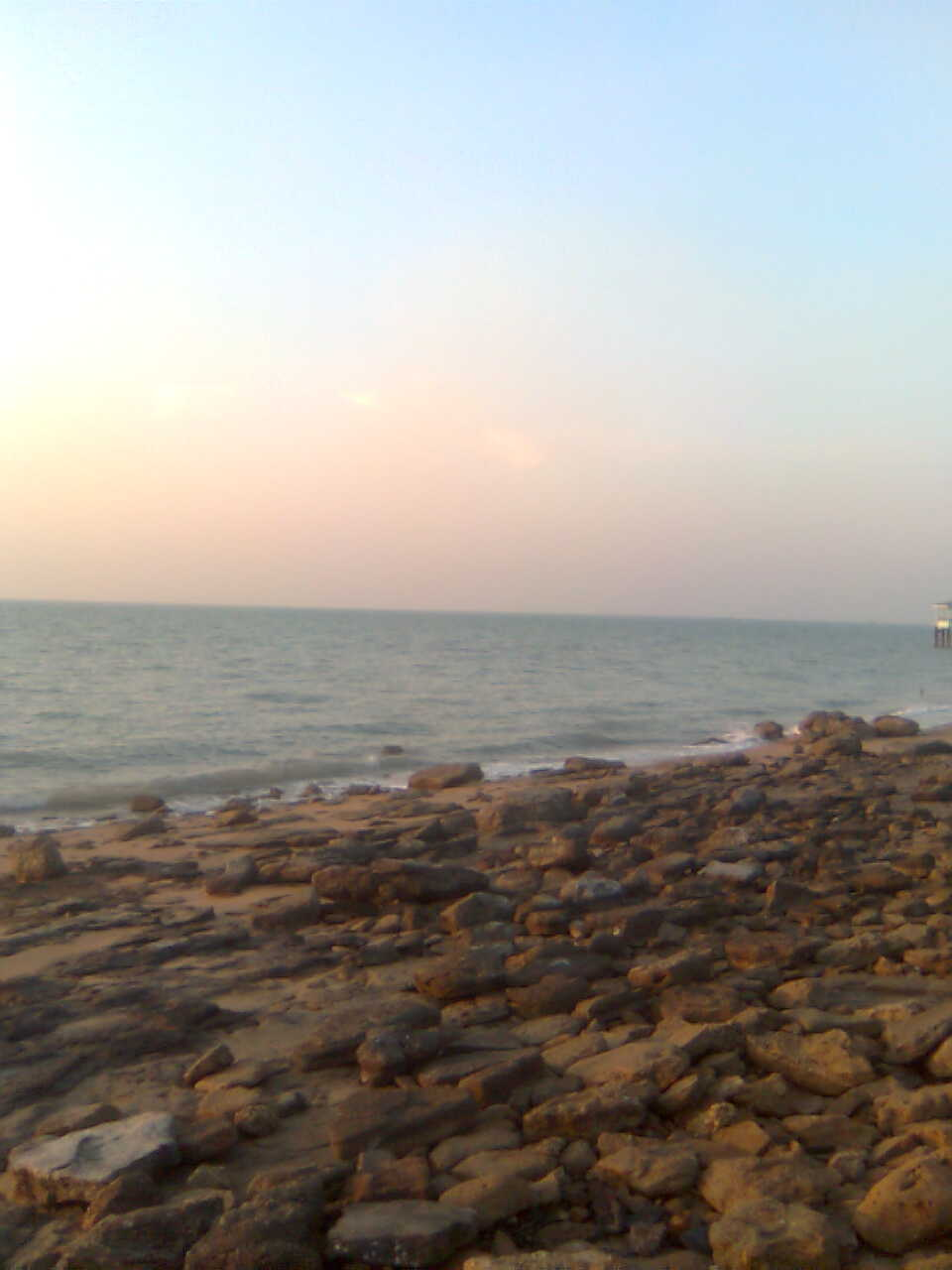
- Beach at Failaka Island

- Location within Kuwait
- Etymology: < Ancient Greek φυλάκιο(ν) fylakio(n) "outpost"

Geography
- Location: Persian Gulf
- Coordinates: 29°26′20″N 48°20′00″E
- Length: 14 km (8.7 mi)
- Width: 6.5 km (4.04 mi)
- Highest point: Rās Sibīcha

Administration
- Kuwait
- Governorate: Capital

Demographics
- Population: 147 (2011)

Additional information
- Time zone: Arabia Standard Time (UTC+3)

Failaka Island, Persian Gulf

Failaka Island (Arabic: فيلكا Faylakah / Fēlaka; Kuwaiti Arabic:فيلچه /fe:lɪt͡ʃə/) is a Kuwaiti Island in the Persian Gulf. The island is 20 km off the coast of Kuwait City in the Persian Gulf.

Failaka Island is located 50 km southeast of the spot where the Tigris and Euphrates Rivers empty into the Persian Gulf. For thousands of years, the island has been a strategic prize to control the lucrative trade that passed up and down the Persian Gulf. Failaka Island has been a strategic location since the rise of the Sumerian city-state of Ur. Due to its strategic location, Failaka Island has been continuously inhabited since antiquity. Up until the Gulf War, it was the longest continuously inhabited place in Kuwait.

== Name ==
The name "Failaka" is thought to be derived from the ancient Greek φυλάκιο(ν) – fylakio(n) "outpost".

== History ==
=== Antiquity ===
Failaka was settled following 2000 BC after a drop in sea level. Failaka has been a strategic location since the rise of the Sumerian city-state of Ur during the third millennium BC. Mesopotamians first settled the island in 2000 BC. Traders from the Sumerian city of Ur inhabited Failaka and ran a mercantile business. The island had many Mesopotamian-style buildings typical of those found in Iraq dating from around 2000 BC.

During the Dilmun era (from ca. 3000 BC), Failaka was known as "Agarum", the land of Enzak, a great god in the Dilmun civilization according to Sumerian cuneiform texts found on the island. During the Neo-Babylonian Period, Enzak was identified with Nabu, the ancient Mesopotamian patron god of literacy, the rational arts, scribes and wisdom. As part of Dilmun, Failaka became a hub for the civilization from the end of the 3rd to the middle of the 1st millennium BC.

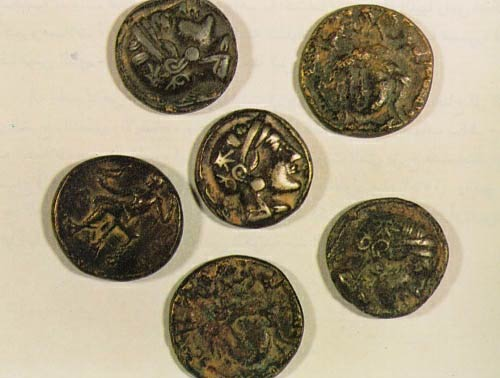
Ancient coins found on Failaka Island.

From about 1650 BC there is a further inscription on a seal found at Failaka and preserving a king's name. The short text readsː [La]'ù-la Panipa, daughter of Sumu-lěl, the servant of Inzak of Akarum. Sumu-lěl was evidently a third king of Dilmun belonging to about this period. Servant of Inzak of Akarum was the king's title in Dilmun. The names of these later rulers are Amoritic.

Despite the scholarly consensus that ancient Dilmun encompasses three modern locations - the eastern littoral of Arabia from the vicinity of modern Kuwait to Bahrain; the island of Bahrain; the island of Failaka of Kuwait - few researchers have taken into account the radically different geography of the basin represented by the Persian Gulf before its reflooding as sea levels rose about 6000 BCE.

Dilmun's commercial power began to decline after 1800 BC. Piracy flourished throughout the region during Dilmun's decline. After 600 BC, the Babylonians added Dilmun to their empire.

After the Dilmun civilization, Failaka was inhabited First Sealand dynasty followed by the Kassites of Mesopotamia, and was formally under the control of the Kassite dynasty of Babylon. Studies indicate traces of human settlement can be found on Failaka dating back to as early as the end of the 3rd millennium BC, and extending until the 20th century AD. Many of the artifacts found in Falaika are linked to Mesopotamian civilizations and seem to show that Failaka was gradually drawn toward the civilization based in Antioch.

Under Nebuchadnezzar II, Failaka was under Babylonian control. Cuneiform documents found in Failaka indicate the presence of Babylonians in the island's population. Babylonian Kings were present in Failaka during the Neo-Babylonian Empire period, Nabonidus had a governor in Failaka and Nebuchadnezzar II had a palace and temple in Falaika. Failaka also contained temples dedicated to the worship of Shamash, the Mesopotamian sun god in the Babylonian pantheon.

After an apparent abandonment of about seven centuries, the bay of Kuwait was repopulated during the Achaemenid period (c. 550‒330 BC). In 4th century BC, the ancient Greeks colonized the bay of Kuwait under Alexander the Great, the ancient Greeks named mainland Kuwait Larissa and Failaka was named Ikaros.

According to Strabo and Arrian, Alexander the Great named Failaka Ikaros because it resembled the Aegean island of that name in size and shape. Various elements of Greek mythology were mixed with the local cults in Failaka. "Ikaros" was also the name of a prominent city situated in Failaka.

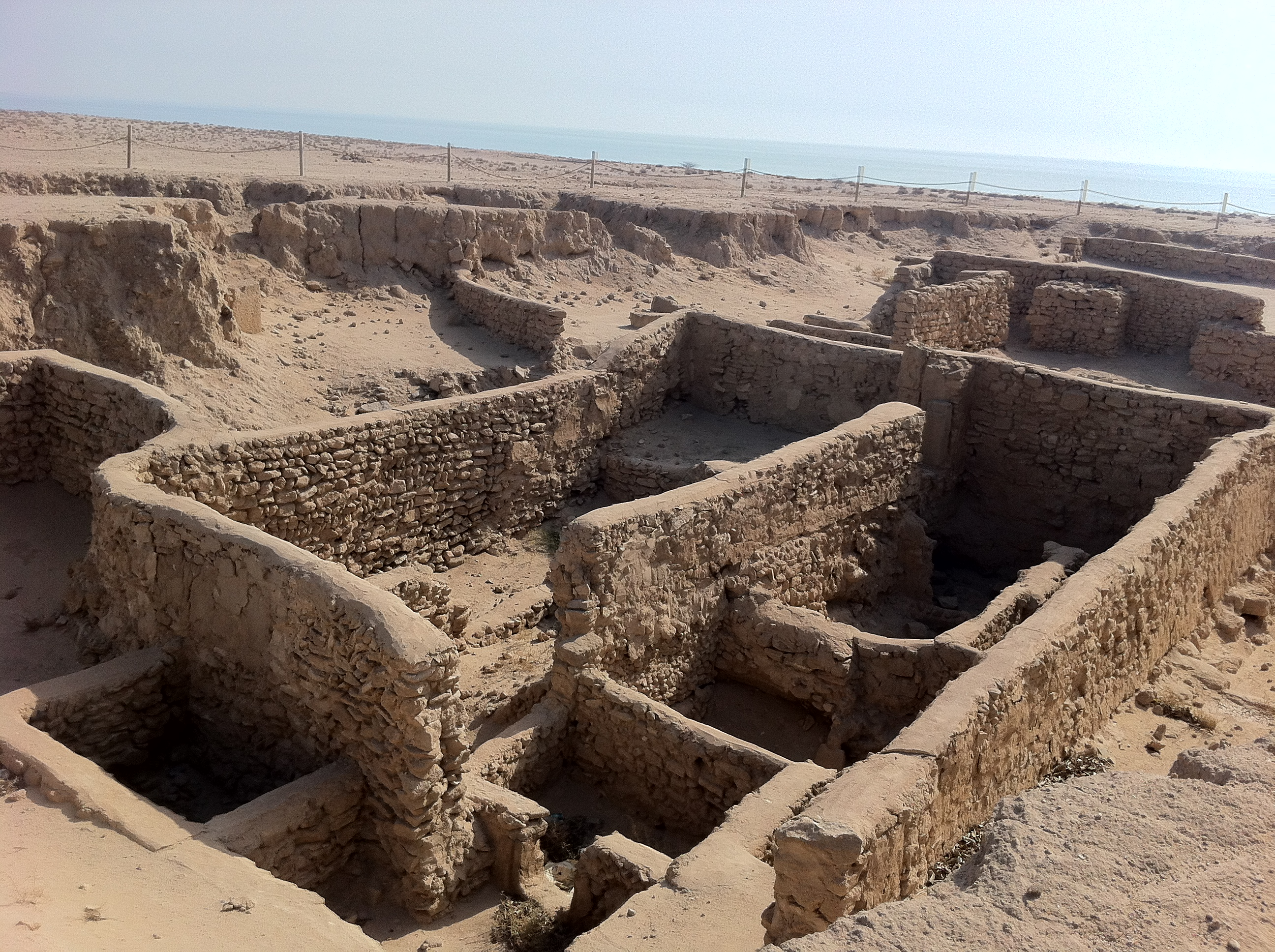
Antiquities of Failaka Island

According to another account, having returned from his Indian campaign to Persia, Alexander the Great ordered the island to be called Icarus, after the Icarus island in the Aegean Sea. This was likely a Hellenization of the local name Akar (Aramaic 'KR), derived from the ancient bronze-age toponym Agarum. Another suggestion is that the name Ikaros was influenced by the local É-kara temple, dedicated to the Babylonian sun-god Shamash. That both Failaka and the Aegean Icarus housed bull cults would have made the identification tempting all the more.

During Hellenistic times, there was a temple of Artemis on the island. The wild animals on the island were dedicated to the goddess and no one should harm them. Strabo wrote that on the island there was a temple of Apollo and an oracle of Artemis (Tauropolus) (μαντεῖον Ταυροπόλου). The island is also mentioned by Stephanus of Byzantium and Ptolemaeus.

Remains of the settlement include a large Hellenistic fort and two Greek temples. Failaka was also a trading post (emporion) of the kingdom of Characene. At the Hellenistic fortress in Failaka, pigs represented 20 percent of the total population, but no pig remains were found in nearby Akkaz.

Nearchos was likely the first Greek to have explored Failaka. The island was further visited and inspected by Archias, Androsthenes of Thasos, and Hiero during three exploration expeditions ordered by Alexander the Great during 324 BC. Failaka might have been fortified and settled during the days of Seleucus I or Antiochos I.

At the time of Alexander the Great, the mouth of the Euphrates River was located in northern Kuwait. The Euphrates river flowed directly into the Persian Gulf via Khor Subiya which was a river channel at the time. Failaka was located 15 kilometers from the mouth of the Euphrates river. By the first century BC, the Khor Subiya river channel dried out completely.

In 127 BC, the kingdom of Characene was established around Teredon in present-day Kuwait. Characene was centered in the region encompassing southern Mesopotamia, including Failaka island. A busy Parthian era Characene commercial station existed on Failaka island.

Failaka was also under the influence of the Achaemenid Empire. There are Aramaic inscriptions that testify Achaemenid presence.

There are also late Sassanian and early-to-late Islamic era settlements across Failaka.

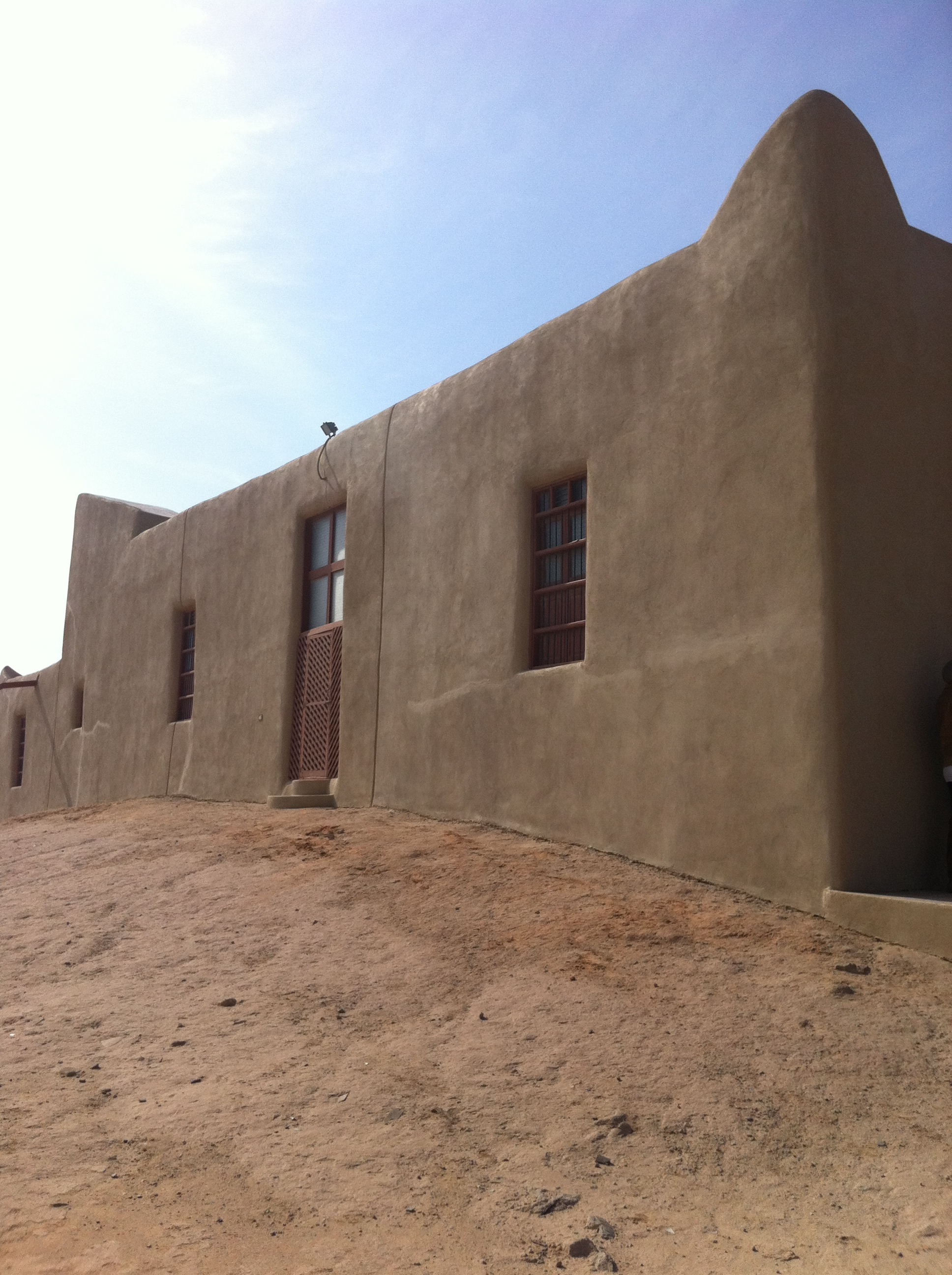
Historic palace

Christian Nestorian settlements flourished in Failaka from the 5th century until the 9th century. Excavations have revealed several farms, villages and two large churches dating from the 5th and 6th century. Archaeologists are currently excavating nearby sites to understand the extent of the settlements that flourished in the eighth and ninth centuries A.D. An old island tradition is that a community grew up around a Christian mystic and hermit. The small farms and villages were eventually abandoned. Remains of Byzantine era Nestorian churches were found at Al-Qusur in Failaka. Pottery at the site can be dated from as early as the first half of the 7th century through the 9th century.

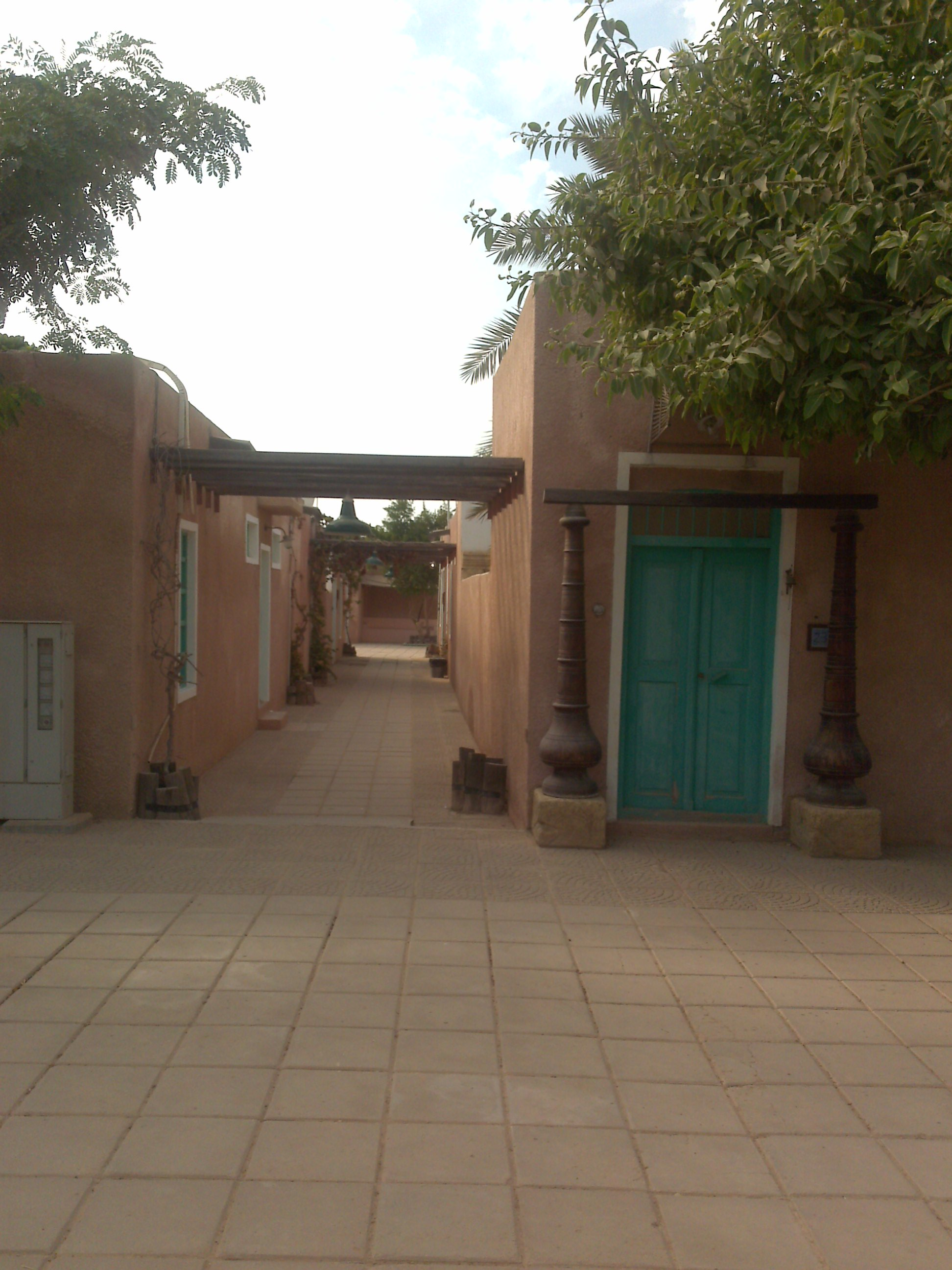
Historic houses

=== Modern era ===
Similar to mainland Kuwait, much of the island’s history between the 8th and 15th centuries remains undocumented, with no evidence of continuous habitation. In the modern era, the earliest recorded presence on the island is that of Sheikh Musaeed Al-Azmi of Al-Awazim tribe, who was born on the island. In 1682, he published a copy of Muwatta Imam Malik, which is considered to be the oldest document in Kuwait’s modern history.

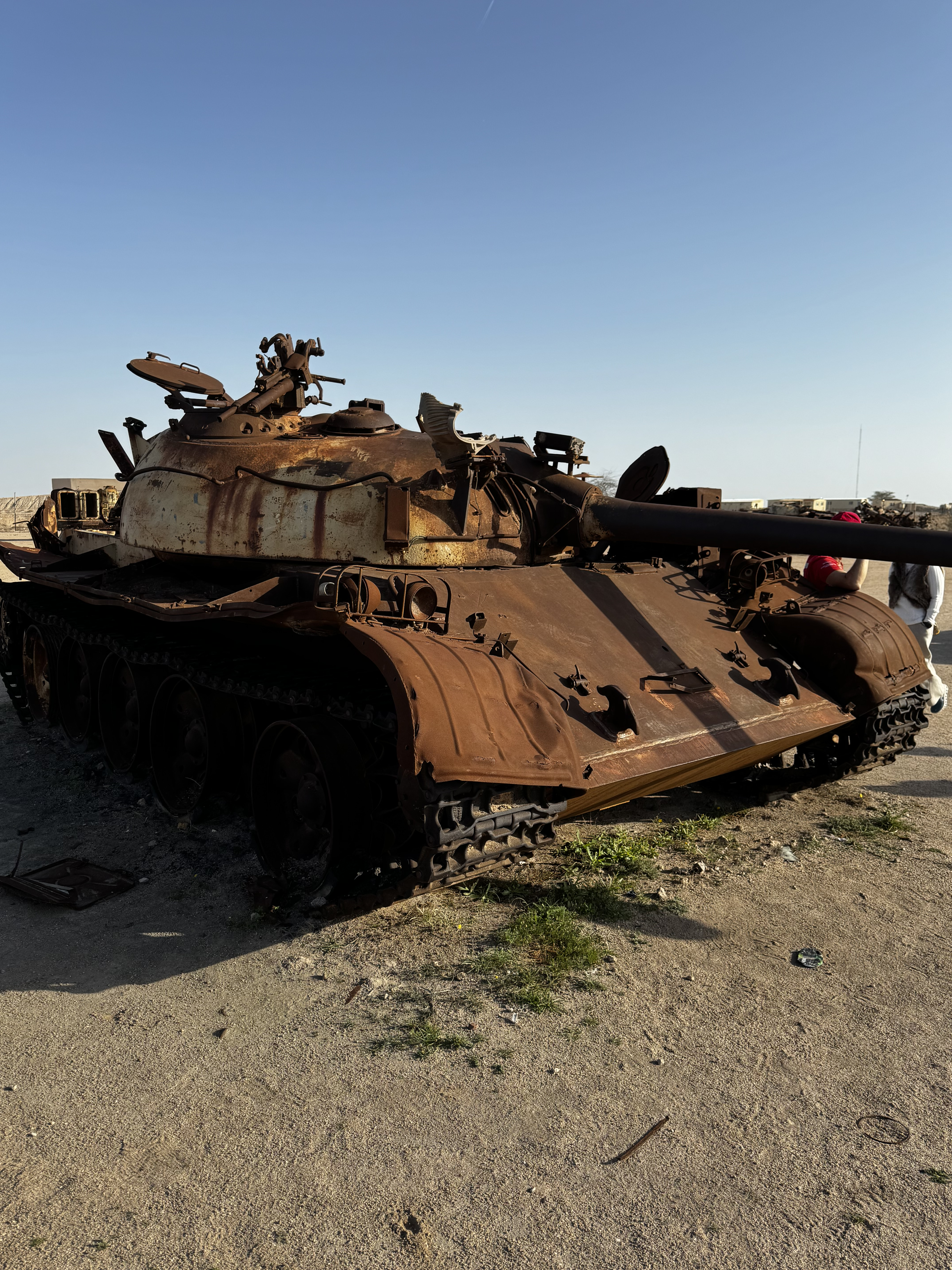
Iraqi Army tanks blown out by US Army during 1991 Gulf War

Prior to the 1990 Iraqi Invasion, the island had over two thousand residents and several schools. The village of Al-Zawr or Zoor is situated near the middle of the northwest side of the island. It was the longest continuously inhabited location in Kuwait. During 1990 and 1991, the invading Iraqis depopulated the island, expelling all of its residents to the mainland. The Iraqi military mined the beaches and used the island's facilities and buildings for target practice. In 1991, the allied forces forced the Iraqi army forces occupying the island to surrender through bombing and psywar operations. The sewage system was destroyed and has yet to be fully repaired. Also, many old homes continue to sit empty and decaying.

After the war, Failaka was cleared of mines, but it remains under military use to some extent. Nevertheless, Failaka Island is becoming a popular holiday destination from Kuwait City since the establishment of the "Wanasa Beach" resort including live music, horse-riding, canoeing, and kayaking activities.

== Climate, geography and the future ==
Failaka Island is located in the northern part of the Persian Gulf. Springtime on Failaka Island is regarded as particularly special by Kuwaitis. Failaka has quite a different ecosystem than mainland Kuwait and its budding flowers and changing temperatures are much appreciated. Although the island's infrastructure remains poor, Failaka is beginning to develop a local tourist industry based upon fishing, boating, swimming, sailing and other water sports.

The few remaining local residents are mostly those Failakawans who lived with their families on the island prior to the Iraqi Invasion of 1990. Most Failakawans have their own boats; while some are involved in tourism, many others are reticent about letting tourism detract from the quiet island life. Some Failakawan families, although now living in mainland Kuwait, regularly go to the island on weekends.

On the mainland, in Kuwait City, various schemes have been discussed to build a bridge to the island and develop Failaka into a vacation paradise. A new hotel resort has encouraged many of the improvements.

On July 15, 2024, Kuwait’s state-owned E&P company Kuwait Petroleum Corporation (KPC) has revealed a "large" light oil and associated gas discovery at an offshore field east of Failaka Island. The preliminary estimates of the hydrocarbon reserves were around 2.1 billion barrels of light oil, and 5.1 trillion standard cubic feet of gas, which brings into play about 3.2 billion barrels of oil equivalent (boe).

== Archaeology ==
The site was excavated by a Danish team led by Geoffrey Bibby between 1958 and 1963. They excavated at four tells in the southwest corner of Failaka, Tell F3, Tell F4, Tell F5 and Tell F6. Tells F4 and F5 dated to the Hellenistic period. Tells F3 (small domestic houses) and F6 (a 400 meter square structure the excavators named the "Palace") dated to the early 2nd millennium BC and covered an area of about 7500 square meters at a height of about 4 meters. About 50 cylinder seals and about 400 stamp seals were found. The oldest cylinder seals were a few from the post-Akkadian, Ur III Empire period, and Old Babylonian period but most were from the Mitanni and Kassite periods with a few of Elamite origin from the time of the 2nd dynasty of Isin. The majority of the stamp seals were of the Dilmun type, first found at the ancient city of Ur A few of the seals had cuneiform inscriptions including one that read "Marduk, excellent prince, merciful god, praised in heaven and on earth, have mercy". Over the years a number of cuneiform seal inscriptions, inscribed stone fragments, and tablet fragments have been found at the site.

A site chronology was established:

- Period 4B - c. 1300-1400 BC
- Period 4A - c. 1400-1500 BC, Kassite period
- Period 3B - c. 1500-1600 BC
- Period 3A - c. 1600-1700 BC, Old Babylonian period
- Period 2B - c. 1700-1800 BC
- Periods 1/2A - c. 1800-2200 BC, Isin-Larsa and Ur III periods

A group from the United States worked in 1974 and 1975 after a reconnaissance in 1972. Between 1984 and 1988 (after a premininary survey in 1983) a French team excavated at the site. On Tell F6 they found a structure they called a "temple", with 2.8 meter thick walls, 15 meters east of the "Palace" and further down two Dilmun seals. Much of the early stonework had been robbed during construction of the nearby Hellenistic fortress. A small (1.8 meter high) Tell G3 was opened on the north end of the site finding two c.2000 BC occupation levels (both stone robbed with a destruction layer between) before hitting virgin soil. A Hellenistic period area B6 200 meters south of the fortress on Tell F5 was excavated. A sanctuary was found with numerous votive objects. Small finds included several bronze coins, a large number of iron or bronze arrowheads, finger rings, a steatite seal, and a number of stone fish-net rings. Several hundred meters north the small site of Tell Khazneh, largely stone-robbed by villagers, was excavated finding a block with an Aramaic inscription.

A team from Georgia excavated at Failaka between 2011 and 2017 focusing on the Al-Awazim area on the northeast coast of the island. An Italian group worked on the island from 2010 until 2014. After a survey in 2012 Polish excavators worked at the Islamic period site Kharaib el-Desht in the northwest part of the island in 2013, 2015, and 2016. Archaeologists from Slovakia and Greece have also worked there. There are indications the site was occupied in the Neo-Babylonian period based on a grave and a foundation stone inscription (found reused in a modern home near Tell F6) "This palace belongs to Nebuchadnezzar, king of Babylon".

In 2025, archaeologists discovered a courtyard and a building at Al-Qurainiya, dating back to the Hellenistic period. The discovery is important because it shows Hellenistic presence also to the northern part of the island.

== Population ==
The majority of Kuwaitis from Failaka Island are of Iranian ancestry. They originally migrated to Failaka from the Iranian coast, mainly Kharg Island and Bandar Lengeh. These people are commonly known as the Huwala in the GCC states. They are predominantly Sunni Muslims and speak Arabic fluently, although prior to the discovery of oil they also spoke fluent Persian. The most important Huwala settlement in Failaka Island pertained to 40 families who migrated from the Iranian island Kharg to Failaka in the years 1841–1842. The most recent settlement occurred in the early 1930s after the imposition of the unveiling law by Reza Shah. A minority of Failaka Island's Kuwaiti families are Shia Persians, they were noted as having their own Hussainiyas and the older generations were frequent Arabic speakers, unlike the Kuwaiti Shia of Persian origin in mainland Kuwait City at the time.

== See also ==
- Akkaz Island
- Bahra 1
- Cities of the ancient Near East
- H3 (Kuwait)
- Kazma
- Subiya, Kuwait
- Umm an Namil Island
