= Shuwaikh Island =

Akkaz
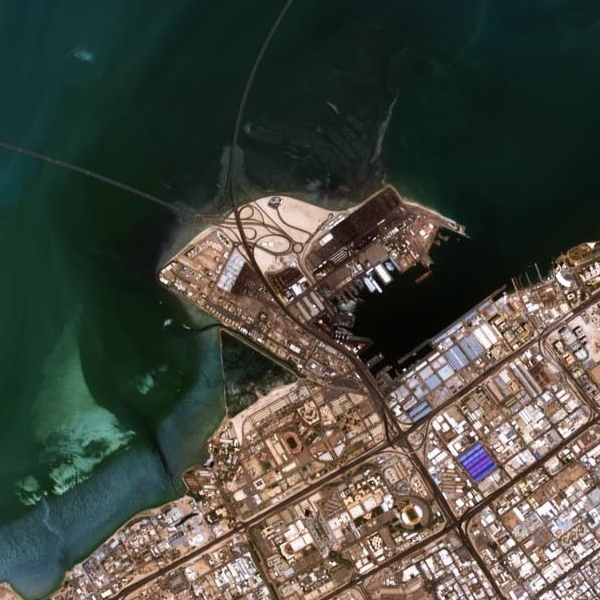

- Location within Kuwait Location within Near East
- 29°21′16″N 47°54′35″E (approximate)
- Location: Kuwait
- Region: Persian Gulf

Shuwaikh Island (Arabic: جزيرة الشويخ), also known as Akkaz Island, is a former island of Kuwait within Kuwait Bay. The former island is now joined to Kuwait's Shuwaikh industrial area as an extension via land bridge and therefore no longer exists as an island.

The area is an archaeological site with pieces dating back to 2000 BC spanning various civilizations such as the Parthian, Sassanid, Hellenistic, Seleucid, Dilmun, Nestorian Christian and Abbasid Caliphate. In 224 AD, Kuwait became part of the Sassanid Empire. At the time of the Sassanid Empire, Kuwait was known as Meshan, which was an alternative name of the kingdom of Characene. Akkaz was a Partho-Sassanian site; the Sassanid religion's tower of silence was discovered in northern Akkaz. In addition to Partho-Sasanian settlements, Akkaz also contains ancient Christian settlements. Characene coins were also discovered in Akkaz.

== See also ==
- Umm an Namil Island
- Failaka Island
- H3 (Kuwait)
- Bahra 1
- Ikaros (Failaka Island)
- Subiya, Kuwait
