= Subiya, Kuwait =

District of Kuwait in Jahra Governorate

Subiya
- Location within Kuwait Location within Near East
- 29.640079°N 48.089175°E
- Location: Kuwait
- Region: Jahra Governorate

Al Subiya (Arabic: الصبية) is a region in northern Kuwait on the north coast of Kuwait Bay. It consisting of several micro-regions: Bahra, H3 (Jazirat Dubaji), Nahdain, Radha, Muhaita, Mughaira, Dubaij, and Ras al-Subiyah. The area features archaeological sites with tumuli graves, settlements, campsites, wells, and shell middens. Most of the tumuli date to the Early and Middle Bronze Age (3rd–2nd millennium BC). Subiya is the location of the Silk City project, the project's first phase was launched in May 2019.

== Archaeological research ==
=== History of research ===
The archaeological sites in the Subiya region were studied by several scientific institutions from all over the world, which cooperated with the National Council for Culture, Arts and Letters of the State of Kuwait (NCCAL). Since 1999, Kuwaiti archaeologists have carried out intensive surveys and excavations in the area, assisted in the years 2004–2005 and 2007–2009 by a joint expedition of the Gulf Cooperation Council (GCC) states. In 1998, the Kuwaiti-British Archaeological Expedition to Kuwait started its work. It conducted a survey of the region and excavated the H3 site, where Dr. Fahad al Wohaibi, director of the National Museum of Kuwait, had discovered earlier fragments of vessels dated to the Ubaid period.

From 2007 to 2012, the Kuwaiti-Polish Archaeological Mission (KPAM) from the Polish Centre of Mediterranean Archaeology University of Warsaw (PCMA UW) carried out archaeological research and surveys in the region. "The Al-Subiya tumuli excavation and survey project. Tumuli graves and other stone structures on the north coast of Kuwait Bay" project focused on salvage excavations required due to the building of a new city, Madinat al-Hareer, in the Subiya region.

In the first phase (2007–2010), the expedition excavated a group of tumuli in the Mughaira micro-region. Later, KPAM extended its area of research to encompass a site in the Muhaita micro-region (a well) and a large Ubaid settlement (Bahra 1). The work was directed by Prof. Piotr Bieliński (PCMA UW) and Sultan Ad-Duweish. In 2010, two subprojects were launched. The first, headed by Dr. Łukasz Rutkowski (PCMA UW), surveyed and excavated stone structures, mainly tumuli graves. The other was directed by Dr. Franciszek Pawlicki (PCMA UW) and focused on locating and studying desert wells.

A Kuwaiti-Georgian archaeological expedition from the Georgian National Museum worked in the Subiya region from 2015, at the same time conducting research on Failaka Island.

=== Archaeological discoveries ===
At the time of Alexander the Great, the mouth of the Euphrates River was located in northern Kuwait. The Euphrates river flowed directly into the Persian Gulf via Khor Subiya which was a river channel at the time. Failaka was located 15 kilometers from the mouth of the Euphrates river. By the first century BC, the Khor Subiya river channel dried out completely.

Subiya was a cultural borderland between Mesopotamia and Neolithic Arabia.

The most interesting, and the most numerous, discoveries in the Subiya region include the tumuli graves (there are approximately 130), especially the most impressing ones—the so-called tumuli with outer ring wall, as well as elongated stone platforms of possibly ritual or symbolic function. Among small objects, adornments deserve special attention: perforated pearls and beads of semi-precious stones (carnelian, agate, lapis lazuli, chrysoprase). There are also numerous shell adornments, including a circular plaque with geometric decoration and a “dot-in-circle” motif characteristic of the Umm an-Nar and Dilmun cultures, which originate from the Persian Gulf region.

=== Dating ===
The main period of use of the cemetery was between 2500 and 1500 BC. Some of the finds are of an earlier (Ubaid period) or later date (Late Bronze Age).

== Development ==
Madinat al-Hareer (Silk City) is being developed in a phased manner, including Subiya as part of the first phase of the city. With the completion of Sheikh Jaber Al-Ahmad Al-Sabah Causeway, a slow but steady development is taking place in Subiya. A deadline for accepting tenders for Silk City has been set for 31 March 2022. A power plant of 5,000 megawatts has already been built in Subiya, the Subiya power plant is the nation's largest electrical generation facility. New police and fire stations recently opened in Subiya. In addition, several mosques and an ambulance hospital recently opened in Subiya. There are a number of new power plants under development in Subiya at the moment. The bridge connecting Subiya to Bubiyan Island recently finished construction.

== See also ==
- Failaka Island
- Akkaz Island
- Umm an Namil Island
- Bahra 1
- H3 (Kuwait)
- Madinat al-Hareer
