= Teredon =

Ancient port city in southern Mesopotamia

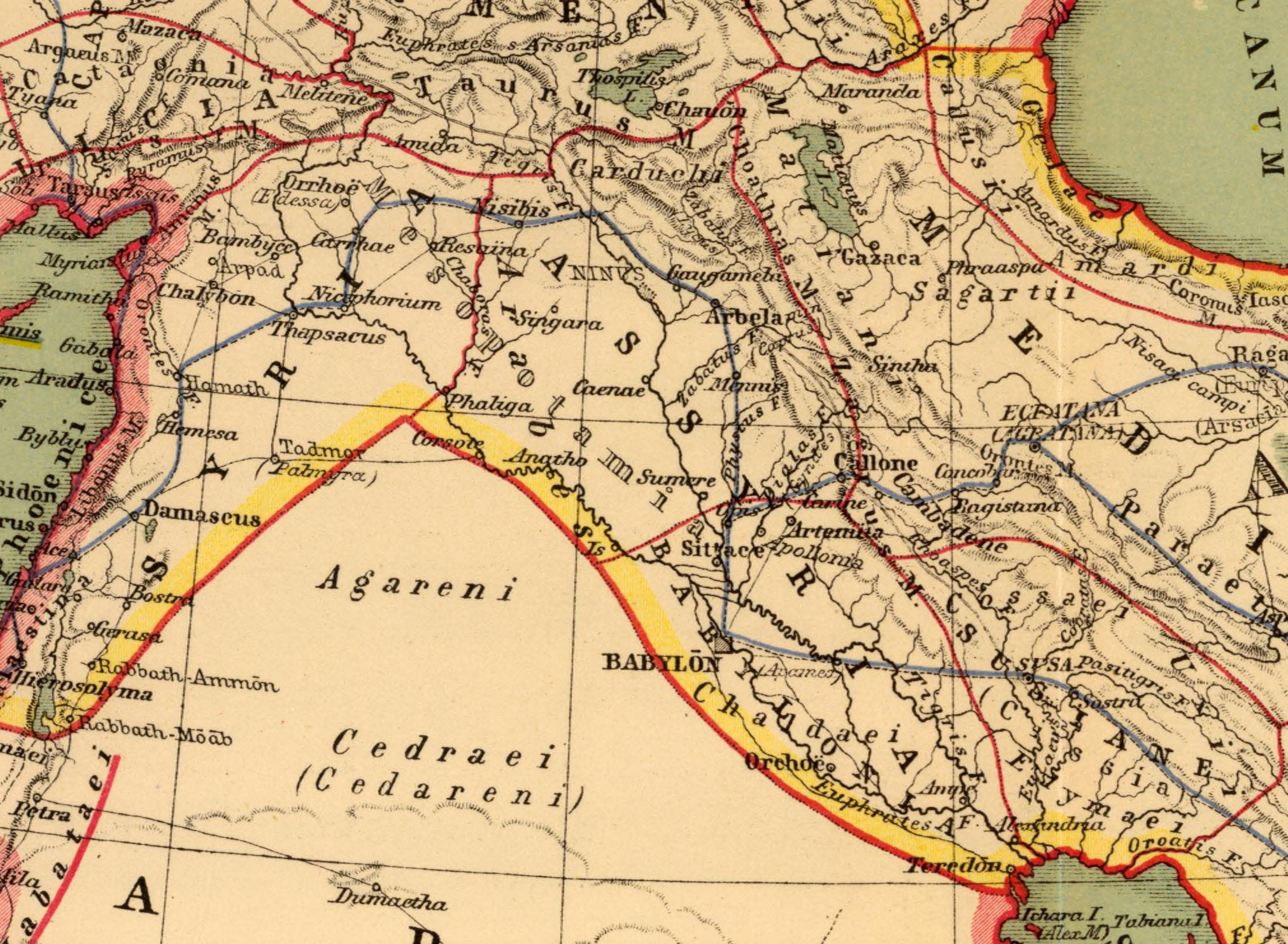

Teredon (Ancient Greek: Τερηδών, romanized: Terēdṓn) was an ancient port city in southern Mesopotamia. The place cannot be localized so far archaeologically, but is believed to be in Kuwait near Basra. The place is mentioned several times by ancient writers. It is said to have been founded by Nebuchadnezzar II, who built a palace with hanging gardens here. Teredon is said to have been located at the mouth of the Euphrates in the Persian Gulf and was an important port city in the Empire of the Characene.
