= Umm al Maradim Island =

Jazirat Umm al Maradim Lighthouse
- Location: Umm al Maradim Island, Kuwait
- Coordinates: 28°40′45″N 48°39′05″E

Tower
- Foundation: concrete base
- Construction: metal skeletal tower
- Height: 22 m (72 ft)
- Shape: square pyramidal tower with balcony and lantern
- Markings: red and white horizontal bands tower
- Power source: solar power
- Operator: Middle East Navigation Aids Service

Light
- Focal height: 23 m (75 ft)
- Range: 10 nmi (19 km; 12 mi)
- Characteristic: Fl(2) W 15s

Umm al Maradim (Arabic: جزيرة ام المرادم)(Translation: Mother of boulders) is an island located at the extreme south of Kuwait's marine borders near the junction with the Kingdom of Saudi Arabia.

Umm Al-Maradim is surrounded by deep waters which enable ships to land directly at its shores - an advantage which is not available on most Kuwaiti islands. It is 1.5 kilometres (0.9 miles) in length and 540 metres (1,770 feet) in width, which represents an area of approximately 65 hectares (160 acres). It is an oval-shaped island with a sand cape. Pearl oysters breed around the island's seabed.

In the past, ships sailed for pearl diving in the morning and returned by night to the island. So the island was crowded with the ships' crews, divers and pearl traders who flocked to purchase the pearl harvest from the ships' captains.

Umm Al-Maradim was the first Kuwaiti land to be liberated from the Invasion of Kuwait in 1991. On its territory the Kuwaiti flag was hoisted again proclaiming the defeat of aggression and the restoration of legality.

The island is usually full of migratory and sedentary birds, notably seagulls and flamingoes. During the rainy season, it is covered with greenery. It is uninhabited except for some public buildings such as a lighthouse and a police station.

Umm Al-Maradim is the rainiest place in Kuwait.

== See also ==
- List of lighthouses in Kuwait
- Bubiyan Island
