= Towns of ancient Greece =

The archetypical settlement in ancient Greece was the self-governing city state called the polis (Ancient Greek: πόλις), but other types of settlement occurred.

== Kome ==
A kome (Ancient Greek: κώμη) was typically a village that was also a political unit. The translation is inexact, but according to Thucydides, Sparta, though it was a polis, resembled four unwalled villages. Similarly, a kome could be a neighbourhood within a larger polis or its own rural settlement. Thucydides mused that the polis had developed from the kome.

== Katoikia ==
A katoikia (Ancient Greek: κατοικία) was similar to a polis, typically a military colony, with some municipal institutions, but not those of a full polis. The word derives from the Ancient Greek: κατοικέω for "to inhabit" (a settlement) and is somewhat similar to the Latin civitas. In the Classical era, there were few katoikiai; however, with the rise of large centralized empires following the conquests of Alexander the Great, they became the main type of Greek settlement, especially in the newly conquered east. Sometimes these were fortresses, inside a city or in an open position. They were an equivalent of the English idea of a fort.

== Colonies ==
Many of the poleis in ancient Greece established colonies, of which many went on to become fully independent poleis of their own. These include:

=== Emporia ===
- An Emporion (Ancient Greek: ἐμπόριον) was a Greek trading-colony and could be a self-contained settlement or a section of either another Greek polis or of a non-Greek town. Emporia were usually found in ports and could be considered to be the reverse of a politeum.

=== Cleruchy ===
- A cleruchy (Ancient Greek: κληρουχία) was a colony, typically Athenian, which despite being in a different location from the mother city, did not achieve independence. Instead, it remained part of the mother city's polis, with citizenship being retained by the settlers, and it may have functioned like a kome.

=== Politeum ===
- Politeuma denoted, particularly in the Seleucid kingdom and Ptolemaic Egypt, enclaves of minority populations of Macedonians, Greeks, Persians and Jews, who had some degree of self-government and independent jurisdiction within a city.

== Military settlements ==
Within the Greek world, several military establishments resembled civilian towns.

- A phrourion (Ancient Greek: φρούριον) was a fortified collection of buildings used as a military garrison and is the equivalent of the Roman castellum (English fortress). The word carries a sense of being a watching entity.
- A stratopedon (Ancient Greek: στρατόπεδον) was an army camp, equivalent to the Roman castra. It differed from a phrourion in that it was not normally permanent.
