= Agarum (toponym) =

Bronze-Age Near Eastern regional name

- Location within Kuwait Location within Near East
- 29°29′20″N 48°20′00″E (approximate)
- Location: Kuwait
- Region: Persian Gulf

Agarum (also transliterated as Agaru or Akarum, cuneiform: a-kà-rum or a-ga-rum) is a bronze-age Near Eastern proper name, probably a toponym for a region or island in the Eastern Arabia and Persian Gulf. Agarum has been generally identified with Kuwait's Failaka Island, known as ´KR to the Arameans and as Ikaros during the Hellenistic times. Failaka's Ekara temple is another probable location. Agarum is sometimes identified with the mediaeval city of Haǧar, in the general region of Al-Ahsa Oasis in Saudi Arabia and Bahrain Island in Bahrain.

The name Agarum is attested in the earlier half of the 2nd millennium BCE, mentioned in inscriptions of the ancient Dilmun civilization. Agarum was associated with Inzak, the chief deity of the Dilmunite pantheon. Several Dilmunite kings styled themselves as "servants of the Inzak of Agarum"; such kings included Rimum (c. 18th century BCE), Yagli-El (c. 18th and 17th centuries BCE), and Sumu-lêl (16th century BCE). "Inzak of Agarum" is also attested on several inscriptions from Failaka, which was an important cultic center of Inzak during the first half of 2nd millennium.

== Origin ==
Dilmunite inscriptions seem to regard Agarum as the home of the deity Inzak. Another interpretation was made in 1880 by sir Henry Rawlinson, who understood the royal texts to indicate that the kings themselves were "of Agarum". He translated the Agarite royal title as "slave of [the God] Inzak, [Man of the tribe] of Agarum". Modern scholarship does not agree with Rawlinson's interpretation.

== Location ==
=== Failaka Island ===
Agarum is generally thought to be the Failaka Island, located near the coast of Kuwait. Failaka was the main center of the cult of Inzak. In the late 1st millennium BCE, the Aramaic name of Failaka was ´KR — probably standing for Akar, likely a diachronic variant of Akarum. The Aramaic BL ´KR ("Bēl of Akar") can be seen as a late re-interpretation of the ancient "Inzak of Agarum". As part of Dilmun, Failaka became a hub for the civilization from the end of the 3rd to the middle of the 1st millennium BC.

In Hellenistic times, Failaka was known as Ikaros. According to The Anabasis of Alexander, this name was given by Alexander the Great, after an Aegean island of the same name. The Greek name was probably based on a folk etymology derived from ´KR. That both Failaka and Aegean Ikaria housed bull cults would have made the identification tempting all the more.29.442°N 48.324°E

Akarum resembles the name of the Ekara temple, which was located at Failaka. Ancient Mesopotamian scribes often morphed foreign words in order to render them satisfyingly into their own writing system. E-kara has a plausible cuneiform etymology; cf. Sumerian é, "house" or "temple". It is unknown which god Ekara was dedicated to, but circumstantial evidence points to the sun-god Shamash. Kings of the Hellenistic Hagar minted coins in the name of Shamash, who may have been the principal deity of the state.

Shamash was associated with palm trees. This may indicate that Ekara and Haǧar are all etymologically related. However, this conjecture becomes unnecessary if the Persian or Arabic etymology of Hagar is accepted. Furthermore, Akarum is only attested in the 2nd millennium BCE, whereas Ekara first appears during the 1st millennium BCE.

Another suggestion is that the Hellenistic name Ikaros derived from Ekara: the name of E-kara would have sounded to Hellenes indistinguishable from the Aegean island of Ikaria. If so, ´KR was merely the Aramaic transliteration of Ikaros. However, there is no evidence of a temple named Ekara during the Neo-Babylonian times, which may indicate its name had already fallen out of use at that point, centuries before the Alexandrian conquests. More likely is that Akarum, Akar, ´KR, and Ikaros are all variants of the same ancient toponym.

== Other theories ==
=== Al-Ahsa Oasis ===
Another possibility is that Agarum refers to the Eastern Arabian mainland, opposite from the isle of Bahrain. This hypothesis holds that the Dilmun civilization originally centered around the Al-Ahsa Oasis region. While the power later shifted to Bahrain, a religious association with Agarum remained. According to this interpretation, Agarum was considered the original home of the god Inzak.

There are Hellenistic 2nd-century BCE coins that contain the inscription ″Haritat, king of Hagar" — the name Hagar is remarkably similar to Agarum. The Hellenistic Hagar is further equated with the mediaeval city of Haǧar, or Hofuf, the main urban center of the Al-Ahsa oases. Interestingly, Al-Ahsa is famous for its flourishing date-palm gardens; Inzak was similarly associated with date-palms.

This hypothesis has been criticized on the grounds that there is a gap of more than a thousand years between the Dilmunite mentions of Agarum and the Hellenistic "king of Hagar". Only three coins mentioning Hagar are known, two from Susa and one without provenance. A competing hypothesis identifies the Hagar coinage with Dumat al-Jandal in Northern Arabia.

Equally problematic is the identification of the Hellenistic Hagar and the later Hasaitic Haǧar. According to Arabic authors, Haǧar was an Arabized form of the Persian Hakar. Alternatively, Hagar and/or Haǧar may derive from Old South Arabian HGR, "(fortified) city". In fact, the 10th-century Yemeni historian Abu Muhammad al-Hasan al-Hamdani mentions several cities with such a name.

=== Bahrain Island ===
The website of the Bahrain Authority for Culture & Antiquities speculates that Agarum was "in fact the name which the ancient Dilmunites originally used for Dilmun" — that is, the isle of Bahrain.

== Sources ==
- Jean-Jacques Glassner: "Dilmun, Magan and Meluhha" (1988); Indian Ocean In Antiquity, edited by Julian Reade. Kegan Paul International, 1996. Reissued by Routledge in 2013. ISBN 9781136155314.
- Steffen Terp Laursen: Royal Mounds of A'ali in Bahrain: The Emergence of Kingship in Early Dilmun. ISD LLC, 2017. ISBN 9788793423190.
- Khaled al-Nashef: "The Deities of Dilmun"; Bahrain Through the Ages: The Archaeology, edited by Scheich ʿAbdāllah Bahrain, Haya Ali Khalifa, Shaikha Haya Ali Al Khalifa & Michael Rice. Routledge, 1986. ISBN 9780710301123.
- Michael Rice: The Archaeology of the Arabian Gulf. Routledge, 2002. ISBN 9781134967933.
