= Bahra 1 =

Archaeological site in the Al Subiyah region on the coast of Kuwait Bay in Kuwait

- Location within Kuwait Location within Near East
- 29°39′35″N 48°3′4″E (approximate)
- Periods: Ubaid period
- Location: Kuwait
- Region: Persian Gulf

Bahra 1 is an archaeological site in the Subiya region on the coast of Kuwait Bay (Kuwait) associated with the Ubaid culture. It is one of the earliest Ubaid culture settlements in the Persian Gulf region, about 5500–4900 BC.

== History of research ==
Bahra 1 was discovered by archeologist Dr. Sultan al Duweish from the NCCAL. Archaeological work on the site is conducted since 2009 by the Kuwaiti-Polish Archaeological Mission (KPAM) from the Polish Centre of Mediterranean Archaeology, University of Warsaw, in cooperation with the National Council for Culture, Arts and Letters of the State of Kuwait. Prof. Piotr Bieliński (PCMA UW) directs the excavations together with Dr. Hamid al Mutairi (NCCAL, since 2014), previously with Dr. Sultan al Duweish (NCCAL, until 2013).

== Archaeological discoveries ==
Stone foundations of walls predominate among the remains of several different kinds of structures that were discovered on the site. A few building phases were distinguished, which proves the settlement was permanent. The research in Bahra 1 contributed new data on the Neolithic in the Persian Gulf and the interaction of this region with Mesopotamia in the Ubaid period. It is the oldest permanent settlement directly south of Mesopotamia. The material culture of the settlement is strongly connected with the Mesopotamian Ubaid Culture. About half of the pottery fragments found at the site is of the Ubaid Ware variety that was imported from Mesopotamia. This assemblage comprises both richly decorated luxury vessels and plain utilitarian ware. Also an array of ceramic small objects from the site, some of them perhaps personal adornments, such as flanged discs and ceramic studs, as well as cupped cones, are typical for that period in Mesopotamia and are considered to be objects of a symbolic meaning for the Ubaid culture. The other half of the pottery assemblage from Bahra 1 belonged to the Coarse Red, a pottery type associated with the Arabian Neolithic. A unique find was a fragment of a copper object, which could point to contacts with the Oman Peninsula where sources of this metal were located.

In 2018, an architectural complex different from the others known from this site was studied. It seems it might have had a cultic character, uniting local tradition with concepts derived from the Ubaid culture, which would make it the oldest cult building not only in Kuwait but in the whole Persian Gulf region.

== See also ==
- Agarum (toponym)
- H3 (Kuwait)

== Bibliography ==
- Robert Carter, The Mesopotamian frontier of the Arabian Neolithic: A cultural borderland of the sixth–fifth millennia BC, Arabian archaeology and epigraphy 2019.
- Anna Smogorzewska, Ceramic form and function in the Neolithic Gulf. A view from Bahra 1, Arabian archaeology and epigraphy 2019.
- Anna Smogorzewska, Local and imported pottery in the Neolithic Gulf: a new perspective from the site of Bahra 1 in Kuwait, “Polish Archaeology in the Mediterranean”, 25, 2017, pp. 595–617, DOI: 10.5604/01.3001.0010.2362
- Piotr Bieliński, Excavations in Units 3, 6, 10, 11, 14 and the north part of House 2 (in:) M. Białowarczuk, A. Reiche, A. Smogorzewska, A. Szymczak, Bahra 1. Excavations in 2014 and 2015. Preliminary Report on the Sixth and Seventh Seasons of Kuwaiti–Polish Archaeological Investigations, Kuwait–Warsaw: NCCAL–PCMA, 2016, p. 29.
- Agnieszka Szymczak & Piotr Bieliński (eds.), As-Sabbija, Autumn 2012. Report on the Eighth Season of Joint Kuwaiti–Polish Archaeological Investigations in Kuwait: Bahra 1, Ubaid Culture Related Settlement (4th Season), 2013, Warsaw.
- Marcin Białowarczuk, Ground and pecked stone industry of Bahra 1, an Ubaid-related settlement in Northern Kuwait. Polish Archaeology in the Mediterranean, 22, 2013, 569–585.
- Andrew Lawler, Uncovering Civilization's Roots, Science, vol. 335, Issue 6070, 2012, p. 790, DOI: 10.1126/science.335.6070.790
