= H3 (Kuwait) =

Archaeological site in Iraq

- Location within Kuwait Location within Near East
- 29°38′30″N 48°09′02″E
- Type: archaeological site
- Periods: Ubaid period
- Location: Kuwait

Site notes
- Excavation dates: 1998–2004

H3 (also H3, as-Sabiyah) is an archaeological site in the Subiya Region (Kuwait) that was occupied during the second half of the sixth millennium BC. It was a cultural borderland between the Mesopotamian and the Arabian Neolithic. Finds at the site include small pieces of bitumen believed to have been used to waterproof boats, providing some of the earliest direct evidence for sea faring. A boat model similar to those in Mesopotamia was also discovered at the site.

== The site and its environment ==
H3 is located on Jazirat Dubaji, a low peninsula on the north side of Kuwait Bay. Originally, the site may have been located on the edge of a shallow lagoon, but today it is surrounded by mud flats. The site consists of a low mound with pottery and flint scattered over the surface. Some architectural remains are visible on the surface as well. Its size has been estimated at 90 by 80 m.

== History of research ==
The site was initially identified by Fahad al-Wohaibi. A preliminary archaeological survey and small-scale excavation were subsequently carried out. Full-scale excavation started in 1998 by a joint team of the British Archaeological Expedition to Kuwait and Kuwait National Museum. Further excavation seasons were carried out between 1999 and 2004. The excavations were directed by Harriet Crawford.

== Occupation history ==
Based on the pottery, H3 has been dated to the Ubaid 2-3 period, or second half of the sixth millennium BC. A single radiocarbon date from the oldest part of the site provided a date of 5511-5324 cal BC. The oldest part of the site is thought to be a fire pit that was exposed in the western part of the site. The excavators interpret it as an installation where fish was processed. The main occupation at H3 consists of several separate stone-built structures, of which two were excavated and several more are visible on the surface. One was an open-air enclosure with a storage room. This area was probably used for the production of stone and flint tools.The second structure consisted of four rooms with corbelled walls, possibly to support a roof. The function of the rooms could not be determined with certainty, but based on the presence of certain artefacts and fish and mammal bones, one of the larger rooms was probably used as living area. Based on these substantial architectural remains, it has been suggested that the inhabitants may have lived for extended periods at the site - if not permanently.

The majority of the pottery at H3 consisted of plain and painted Ubaid ware. This pottery has been dated to Ubaid 2-3, with parallels found at sites like Choga Mami in Mesopotamia and Dosariyah along the Gulf coast. Based on the abundant presence of fish bones and fishing equipments, fishing must have been of considerable importance at the site. Fishing was practiced in shallow water, but there is evidence for deep-water fishing as well. Some of the species identified at H3, such as tuna, are no longer present in Kuway Bay today. Gazelle and sheep/goat bones were also present, indicating that the occupants of H3 also practiced hunting as well as pastoralism. Date stones found at the site are among the earliest evidence in the world for date consumption, together with stones from Dalma Island (UAE). The inhabitants of H3 also manufactured shell jewelry, possibly to be traded with other communities.

According to Robert Carter, H3 has been interpreted as a cultural borderland between Mesopotamian and Arabian Neolithic. The settlement has been interpreted as belonging to a local Arabian Neolithic tradition that practiced extensive contacts with the Ubaid settlements of Mesopotamia. It is likely that people of Mesopotamian origin lived in H3 and practiced Mesopotamian agriculture and cereal farming techniques. These contacts also likely involved trade, where Ubaid pottery, shells and pearls were commodities.

== Seafaring ==
H3 has provided intriguing evidence for seafaring. The first piece of evidence is a ceramic model depicting a reed-bundle boat. Similar models have been found at Mesopotamian sites including Eridu, 'Oueili and 'Ubaid, but the model from H3 is more detailed, for example with incisions that mimic the reed bundles from which the real boat would have been constructed. The second consists of a ceramic disc made from a sherd that appears to depict a reed bundle boat with two masts. This is the oldest evidence for the use of masts and sails. Finally, many pieces of bitumen with barnacles attached on one side and reed impressions on the other side were found at H3. The bitumen is interpreted as a waterproof coating that was applied to a reed-bundle boat. These pieces are the earliest evidence for actual boats in Western Asia, and the earliest evidence for seagoing vessels in the world. Geochemical analysis of the bitumen showed that it originated from a source in Burgan, to the south of H3.

== See also ==
- Bahra 1
