= Index of Kuwait-related articles =

This page list topics related to Kuwait.

== 0-9 ==
- 1983 Kuwait bombings
- 1983–1988 Kuwait terror attacks
- 1985 Kuwait City bombings
- 2009 Kuwait wedding fire
- 2015 Kuwait mosque bombing
- 2024 Mangaf building fire
- 2026 Iranian strikes on Kuwait

== A ==
- Andalous
- Abdullah Al-Salem
- Adiliya
- Agriculture in Kuwait
- Ahmad al-Jaber Air Base
- Ahmadi Governorate
- Al Rai
- Ali Al Salem Air Base
- 'Ajam of Kuwait
- Amiri Diwan of Kuwait
- Architecture of Kuwait
- Areas of Kuwait
- Armenians in Kuwait
- Art of Kuwait
- Al Hamra Tower

== B ==
- Battle of Dasman Palace
- Bubiyan Island
- Burgan Bank
- Bneid Al-Gar
- Bayan
- Bayan Palace

== C ==
- Cabinet of Kuwait
- Capital Governorate (Kuwait)
- Central Bank of Kuwait
- Christianity in Kuwait
- Cinema of Kuwait
- Coat of arms of Kuwait
- Coeducation in Kuwait
- Commercial Bank of Kuwait
- Constitution of Kuwait
- Co-op Society
- Corruption in Kuwait
- COVID-19 pandemic in Kuwait
- Crime in Kuwait
- Culture of Kuwait

== D ==
- Dasma
- Demographics of Kuwait

== E ==
- Economy of Kuwait
- Elections in Kuwait
- Electoral districts of Kuwait
- Emblem of Kuwait
- Emir of Kuwait
- Energy in Kuwait
- Environmental issues in Kuwait
- Expatriates in Kuwait

== F ==
- Failaka Island
- Faylaka Island attack
- Farwaniya
- Farwaniya Governorate
- Fires of Kuwait
- Flag of Kuwait
- Football in Kuwait
- Foreign relations of Kuwait
- Freedom of religion in Kuwait

== G ==
- Gate of Kuwait
- Geography of Kuwait
- Geology of Kuwait
- Government of Kuwait
- Governorates of Kuwait
- Grand Mosque
- Granada (Kuwait)
- Green Island
- Gulf Bank of Kuwait
- Gulf Cooperation Council
- Gulf Road

== H ==
- Hawalli Governorate
- Health in Kuwait
- Healthcare in Kuwait
- Historical, Vintage, and Classical Cars Museum
- History of Kuwait
- History of the Jews in Kuwait
- Human rights in Kuwait

== I ==
- Invasion of Kuwait
- Islam in Kuwait
- ISO 3166 standard for Kuwait

== J ==
- Jahra Governorate
- Jazeera Airways
- Jleeb Al-Shuyoukh
- Jaber International Tennis Complex

== K ==
- Khaitan
- Kuwait
- Kuwait Air Force
- Kuwait Airways
- Kuwait Army
- Kuwait Bay
- Kuwait City
- Kuwait Cricket Association
- Kuwait Crown Prince Cup
- Kuwaiti Diaspora
- Kuwait Emir Cup
- Kuwait Flour Mills & Bakeries Company
- Kuwait Football Association
- Kuwait Fund for Arab Economic Development
- Kuwait International Airport
- Kuwait Investment Authority
- Kuwait-Iraq barrier
- Kuwait Liberation Medal
- Kuwait National Guard
- Kuwait National Petroleum
- Kuwait News Agency
- Kuwait Oil Co.
- Kuwait Petroleum Corporation
- Kuwait Stock Exchange
- Kuwait Scientific Center
- Kuwait Times
- Kuwait Telecommunications Tower
- Kuwait Television
- Kuwait Towers
- Kuwait Water Towers
- Kuwait University
- Kuwaiti Americans
- Kuwaiti Arabic
- Kuwaiti cuisine
- Kuwaiti Dinar (Kuwait Currency)
- Kuwaiti Persian
- Kubbar Island

== L ==
- Languages of Kuwait
- Legal system of Kuwait
- LGBT rights in Kuwait (Gay rights)
- Literature of Kuwait

== M ==
- Military of Kuwait
- Ministry of Awqaf & Islamic Affairs
- Ministry of Commerce & Industry
- Ministry of Defense
- Ministry of Electricity, Water and Renewable Energy
- Ministry of Finance
- Ministry of Foreign Affairs
- Ministry of Health
- Ministry of Information(formerly known)
- Ministry of Information and Culture(currently known)
- Ministry of Interior
- Ministry of Justice
- Mubarak Al-Kabeer (governorate)
- Music of Kuwait

== N ==
- National Anthem of Kuwait
- National Assembly of Kuwait
- National Bank of Kuwait

== O ==
- Oil industry of Kuwait
- Oil reserves in Kuwait
- Order of Kuwait
- Order of Mubarak the Great
- Orders, decorations, and medals of Kuwait

== P ==
- Politics of Kuwait
- Political issues in Kuwait
- Postage stamps and postal history of Kuwait
- Public holidays in Kuwait
- Prostitution in Kuwait

== Q ==
- Qurain Cultural Festival

== R ==
- Religion in Kuwait
- Riggae
- Roads in Kuwait

== S ==
- Sheikhdom of Kuwait
- Souk Al-Manakh stock market crash
- Sport in Kuwait
- Square Capital Tower
- Sabah Al-Ahmad Sea City
- Salmiya
- Shuwaikh
- Sulaibiya

== T ==
- Telecommunications in Kuwait
- Telephone numbers in Kuwait
- Television in Kuwait
- Terrorism in Kuwait
- Time in Kuwait
- Timeline of Kuwait City
- Tourism in Kuwait
- Transport in Kuwait

== U ==
- Umm al Maradim Island
- Umm an Namil Island

== V ==
- Vehicle registration plates of Kuwait
- Visa policy of Kuwait
- Visa requirements for Kuwaiti citizens

== W ==
- Women in Kuwait
- Women's suffrage in Kuwait

== Y ==
- Yarmouk
- Youth Association of Kuwait

== Z ==
- Al Zour Refinery

== Lists ==
- List of airlines of Kuwait
- List of airports in Kuwait
- List of banks in Kuwait
- List of companies of Kuwait
- List of football stadiums in Kuwait
- List of hospitals in Kuwait
- List of islands of Kuwait
- List of Kuwaiti artists
- List of Kuwaitis
- List of mosques in Kuwait
- List of museums in Kuwait
- List of newspapers in Kuwait
- List of political parties in Kuwait
- List of prime ministers of Kuwait
- List of schools in Kuwait
- List of shopping malls in Kuwait
- List of speakers of Kuwait National Assembly
- List of tallest buildings in Kuwait
- List of universities in Kuwait

== See also ==
- Lists of country-related topics - similar lists for other countries
