= Hasa =

Hasa may refer to:

- Hasa (Korean military), a rank in the Korean military
- Al-Ahsa Oasis, an oasis region in eastern Saudi Arabia.
  - Al-Ahsa Eyalet, or Lahsa Eyalet, a subdivision of the Ottoman Empire, now part of Saudi Arabia, Kuwait, and Qatar
  - Al-Ahsa Governorate, a governorate in Saudi Arabia
  - Hofuf, or Al-Hasa or Al-Ahsa, a major city
- Hasa, Al Madinah, Saudi Arabia
- Hearing and Speech Agency of Baltimore
- Hasa of Eshtemoa (3rd–4th century CE), Jewish scholar
- Has-a, a relationship between objects in object-oriented programming
- Wadi al-Hasa, also called Wadi Hasa, a wadi in Jordan
- Highly accelerated stress audit, a test method to find electronic product defects

== See also ==
- Al-Hasa (disambiguation)
