= Hasawi =

Hasawi (Arabic: حساوي) may refer to:

- from or related to the ancient or modern areas of Al-Ahsa
- Hasawi, a division of Jleeb Al-Shuyoukh, Kuwait
- Fawaz Al-Hasawi (born 1968), Kuwaiti businessman and former owner of Nottingham Forest FC

== See also ==
- Hasaitic, an Ancient North Arabian dialect
