= Orders, decorations, and medals of Kuwait =

Awards and Decoration of Kuwait

The awards and decorations of Kuwait includes the following:

- Order of Mubarak the Great (Wisam al-Mubarak al-Kabir). The highest ranking order in the country. Insignia was re-designed in 1992. Awarded in two classes with the collar awarded to heads of state only.
- Order of Kuwait (Wisam al-Kuwait). Awarded in 6 classes with the highest class reserved for princes or heads of government.
- Order of National Defence, created in 1962 to award long and distinguished military service.
- Order of Military Duty (Wisam al-Iftiqhar al-Askari), created in 1962 to award bravery and good service.
- Kuwait Liberation Medal (Kuwait) (Order of the Liberation) (Wisam al-Tahrir). Established in 1993 to honor the services of Kuwaiti and allied personnel during the war for the liberation of Kuwait. Awarded in 5 classes.
- Military Service Medal
- Parliamentary Medal (Wisam Al-Majlis)
