= Hassa =

Hassa may refer to:

- Hassa, Hatay, a municipality and district of Hatay Province in Turkey
- Hussa bint Ahmed Al Sudairi (also called Hassa; 1900–1969), wife of King Abdulaziz of Saudi Arabia
- a slang term for the South American edible fish Hoplosternum

== See also ==
- Al-Hasa (disambiguation)
