= List of private and parochial schools in Baltimore =

The following private and parochial schools operate in Baltimore. Updated February 2022.

School name	Affiliation	Gender	Grades	Website
Archbishop Curley High School	Roman Catholic	boys	9-12	www.archbishopcurley.org
Bais Yaakov of Baltimore	Jewish	girls	6-12	www.baisyaakov.net
Baltimore Junior Academy	Seventh-day Adventist	co-ed	K-12	www.bjacademy.org
Boys' Latin School of Maryland	non-sectarian	boys	K-12	www.boyslatinmd.com
The Bryn Mawr School	non-sectarian	girls	PK-12	www.brynmawrschool.org
Calvert School	non-sectarian	co-ed	K-8	www.calvertschoolmd.org
The Catholic High School of Baltimore	Roman Catholic	girls	9-12	thecatholichighschool.org
Friends School of Baltimore	Quaker	co-ed	PK-12	www.friendsbalt.org
Gateway School	non-sectarian	co-ed	PK-6	www.hasa.org/school
Hampden Christian School	Mennonite	co-ed	PK-8	hampdencs.org
Gilman School	non-sectarian	boys	K-12	www.gilman.edu
The GreenMount School	non-sectarian	co-ed	K-8	www.greenmountschool.org
Institute of Notre Dame	Roman Catholic	girls	9-12	www.indofmd.org
Lab School of Baltimore	non-sectarian	co-ed	K-12	www.labschool.org
Mercy High School	Roman Catholic	girls	9-12	www.mercyhighschool.com
Mount Saint Joseph College	Roman Catholic	boys	9-12	www.msjnet.edu
The Park School of Baltimore	non-sectarian	co-ed	K-12	www.parkschool.net
Roland Park Country School	non-sectarian	girls	K-12	www.rpcs.org
School of the Cathedral of Mary our Queen	Roman Catholic	co-ed	K-8	schoolofthecathedral.org
St. Frances Academy	Roman Catholic	co-ed	9-12	www.sfacademy.org
Seton Keough High School	Roman Catholic	girls	9-12	www.setonkeough.com
Waldorf School of Baltimore	non-sectarian	co-ed	PK-8	www.waldorfschoolofbaltimore.org
Yeshivat Rambam	Jewish	co-ed	PK-8	www.yrambam.org
