= Armenians in Kuwait =

Total population
- 6,000

Regions with significant populations
- Kuwait City

Languages
- Armenian and Arabic

Religion
- Armenian Apostolic Church

Related ethnic groups
- Armenian diaspora

The Armenians in Kuwait are people of Armenian descent living in Kuwait. As of 2013, there has been a large population increase and now there are 6,000 Armenians. Before the Gulf War, the Armenian population reached its peak of 12,000. After the Iraqi invasions, the numbers of the Armenians resident in Kuwait greatly diminished to just 500, as they left the country.

== History ==
The first known Armenian presence in Kuwait came in the late 1890s-1900 (turn of the century). As a result of the Armenian genocide, many survivors were forced to first settle in the Levant including Lebanon, Syria, Egypt and Iraq.

The first Armenian families were established in 1947, including Boghos Hovakimian with his wife Arousiag, whose son Hovak was born in 1952, the first Armenian born in Kuwait American hospital, as well as Mihran Zakarian and his family. At that time there was less than 40 single Armenian men in Kuwait. Among them were Nerses Shaghzoian, Ashot Babken, and Samuel Galoustian (in the early 1950s) and Hrair Hagopian (in the late 1950s) who had migrated from Iran. The most famous Armenian presence in Kuwait came immediately after the rise of Arab nationalism in Syria and Egypt in the 1950s and the 1960s.

In 1958, the first wave of Arab nationalism appeared in Syria and Egypt. This did not sit well with the large Armenian communities in these countries. The establishment of the United Arab Republic triggered a mass exodus of Armenians to Lebanon (from Syria) and to Canada and the United States (from Egypt). Some Syrian-Armenians immigrated to Kuwait, when it was still a British mandate.

The first wave of Armenian immigrants to Kuwait were people looking to escape the turmoil in other Arab states. They consisted of engineers and contractors from Iran and also skilled craftsmen from Aleppo who found work in Kuwait’s light industry, auto repair, auto body, plumbing, electrical and service sector.

A new influx of young Armenians created the need to establish an Armenian school in Kuwait, which was spearheaded by Vigen Shaghzo (aka Vicken Shaghzoian). In 1960, Vigen Shaghzo and his brother Arshavir Shaghzo, supported by other prominent members of the Armenian community, established Kuwait's first Armenian School and Armenian Apostolic Church.

By the mid-1980s, the Armenian population of Kuwait reached its peak of 12,000. During and after Operation Desert Storm, the population diminished as many Armenians immigrated to North America. As of 2013, there are roughly 6,000 Armenians in Kuwait.

== Armenians during the Iraqi invasion ==
In August 1990, Iraq declared war on Kuwait and invaded its tiny neighbour. During this time, many Kuwaiti-Armenians left for neighbouring Arab countries such as Syria, Lebanon and the Persian Gulf. Other Armenians fled to Baghdad by car, from where they fled to Syria.

The remaining Armenians were mostly workers with no way of escaping. During the invasion, the Armenian school and church were shut down and guarded in order to stop looters from attacking the institutions. The Armenian institutions remained unscathed during the war.

After the Iraqis were driven out of Kuwait by the coalition forces, the Armenian community had largely diminished to about 500 Armenians. The war also paved the way for a mass exodus of Kuwaiti-Armenians to North American countries such as Canada and the United States.

== Re-establishment of the Kuwaiti-Armenian community ==
The Armenian population of Kuwait has slowly grown since the end of the First Gulf War. Their population number now is around 6,000.

Today, the Armenian school in Kuwait enrolls children from kindergarten to the 12th grade. The school, the only foreign institution which is allowed to incorporate religion into its curriculum, now has nearly 300 students, and a staff of 25 full-time teachers, including 17 Armenians. This is lower than pre-war levels which had enrollment numbers up to 700 students. The Armenian community is slowly rebuilding to try to bring back its better days of the mid-1980s.

== Religion ==
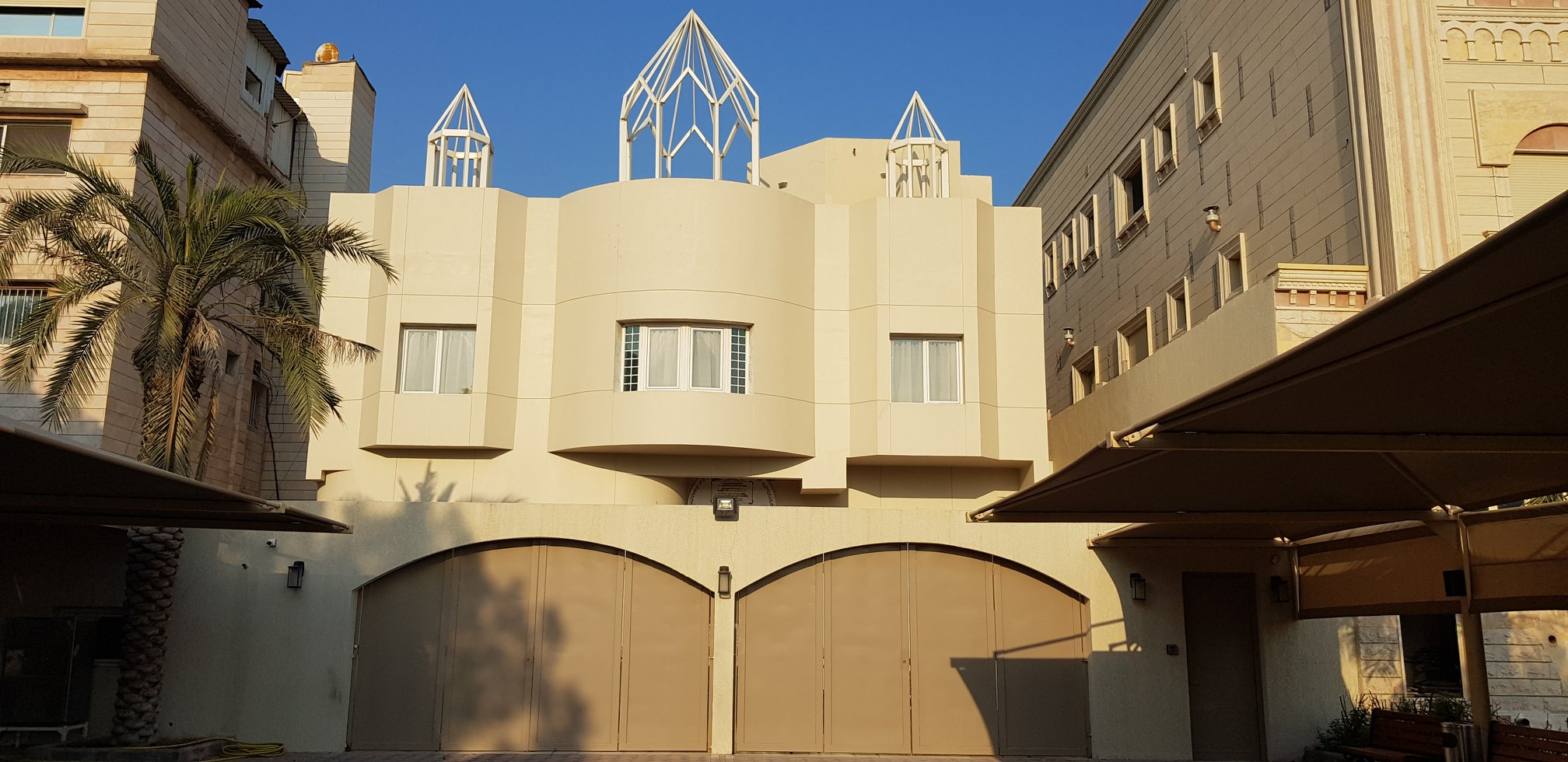
Armenian church in Kuwait.

Most of the Armenian population belongs to the Armenian Apostolic Church and is under the jurisdiction of the Holy See of Cilicia. Kuwait is part of the Prelacy of Kuwait and the Persian Gulf established by the See of Cilicia (also known as the Catholicosate of the Great House of Cilicia), with its head office in Kuwait itself.

== See also ==
- Armenia–Kuwait relations
- Armenian diaspora
- Expatriates in Kuwait
- Armenians in the Middle East
