= Prostitution in Kuwait =

Prostitution in Kuwait is illegal, but common. Most of the prostitutes are foreign nationals.

Law enforcement usually deports prostitutes or makes them sign a "good conduct pledge" before release. Those running prostitution rings normally receive jail sentences. There are allegations that some police received bribes from brothels and warn them of upcoming raids.

Different nationalities of prostitutes and their controlling pimps tend to be found in different areas. Filipinos in Ahmadi Governorate, Ethiopians in Hawalli Governorate, and Indians, Sri Lankans and Bangladeshis in Farwaniya Governorate and part of Salmiya. The Indians and Chinese work the malls in Salmiya. There are also Arab, Central Asian and Eastern European prostitutes in the country.

Brothels are known to exist in Al Jahra, Hawalli, Jleeb Al-Shuyoukh, Salmiya, Fahaheel, Fintas and Jabriya.

== History ==
During the era of slavery in Kuwait, prostitution was connected to slavery. The Islamic Law formally prohibited prostitution. However, since the principle of concubinage in Islam in Islamic Law allowed a man to have intercourse with his female slave, prostitution was practiced by a pimp selling his female slave on the slave market to a client, who was allowed to have intercourse with her as her new owner, and who after intercourse returned his ownership of her to her pimp on the pretext of discontent, which was a legal and accepted method for prostitution in the Islamic world. Slavery in Kuwait was however abolished in 1949.

== Sex trafficking ==
Kuwait is a "destination country for men and women subjected to forced labor and, to a lesser degree, forced prostitution". Kuwait's sponsorship law—which ties a migrant worker's legal residence and valid immigration status to an employer, restricts workers’ movements and penalises them for leaving abusive workplaces. Sources report runaway domestic workers are sometimes exploited in forced prostitution by agents or criminals, who manipulate their illegal status.

In 2016, the government investigated six potential sex trafficking cases and prosecuted 15 suspects, compared to six cases investigated and 20 suspects prosecuted during the previous reporting period. Seven prosecutions from 2015 remained pending at the close of the reporting year. The government achieved nine convictions, including one Kuwaiti citizen—under the anti-trafficking law, on par with eight convictions the previous year; five accused traffickers were acquitted.

The United States Department of State Office to Monitor and Combat Trafficking in Persons ranks Kuwait as a 'Tier 2 Watch List' country.
