= Ahsa =

Ahsa or AHSA may refer to:

- Al-Ahsa Oasis, an oasis region in eastern Saudi Arabia
  - Al-Ahsa Eyalet, or Lahsa Eyalet, a subdivision of the Ottoman Empire, now part of Saudi Arabia, Kuwait, and Qatar
  - Al-Ahsa Governorate, a governorate in Saudi Arabia
  - Hofuf, or Al-Ahsa or Al-Hasa, a major city
    - Al-Ahsa International Airport, Hofuf
- African Heritage Studies Association, a splinter group of the African Studies Association
- American Horror Story: Asylum, an American television miniseries
- American Horse Shows Association
- American Hunters and Shooters Association
- , the Gothic letter a; see Gothic alphabet, Ansuz rune

== See also ==
- Al-Ahsa (disambiguation)
