= List of sovereign states by immigrant and emigrant population =

These are lists of countries by foreign-born population (immigrants) and lists of countries by number of native-born persons living in a foreign country (emigrants).

According to the United Nations, in 2024 the United States, Germany, Saudi Arabia, France and the United Kingdom had the largest numbers of immigrants of any country, while Tuvalu, Saint Helena, Ascension and Tristan da Cunha, and Tokelau had the lowest. In terms of percentage of population, the United Arab Emirates, Qatar and Kuwait had the highest shares, while Cuba, Madagascar and China had the lowest.

According to estimates from the same UN 2015 report, in 2013 India and Mexico had the highest numbers of native-born persons living in a foreign country, while Tokelau and San Marino had the lowest.

Illegal immigration can be underreported.

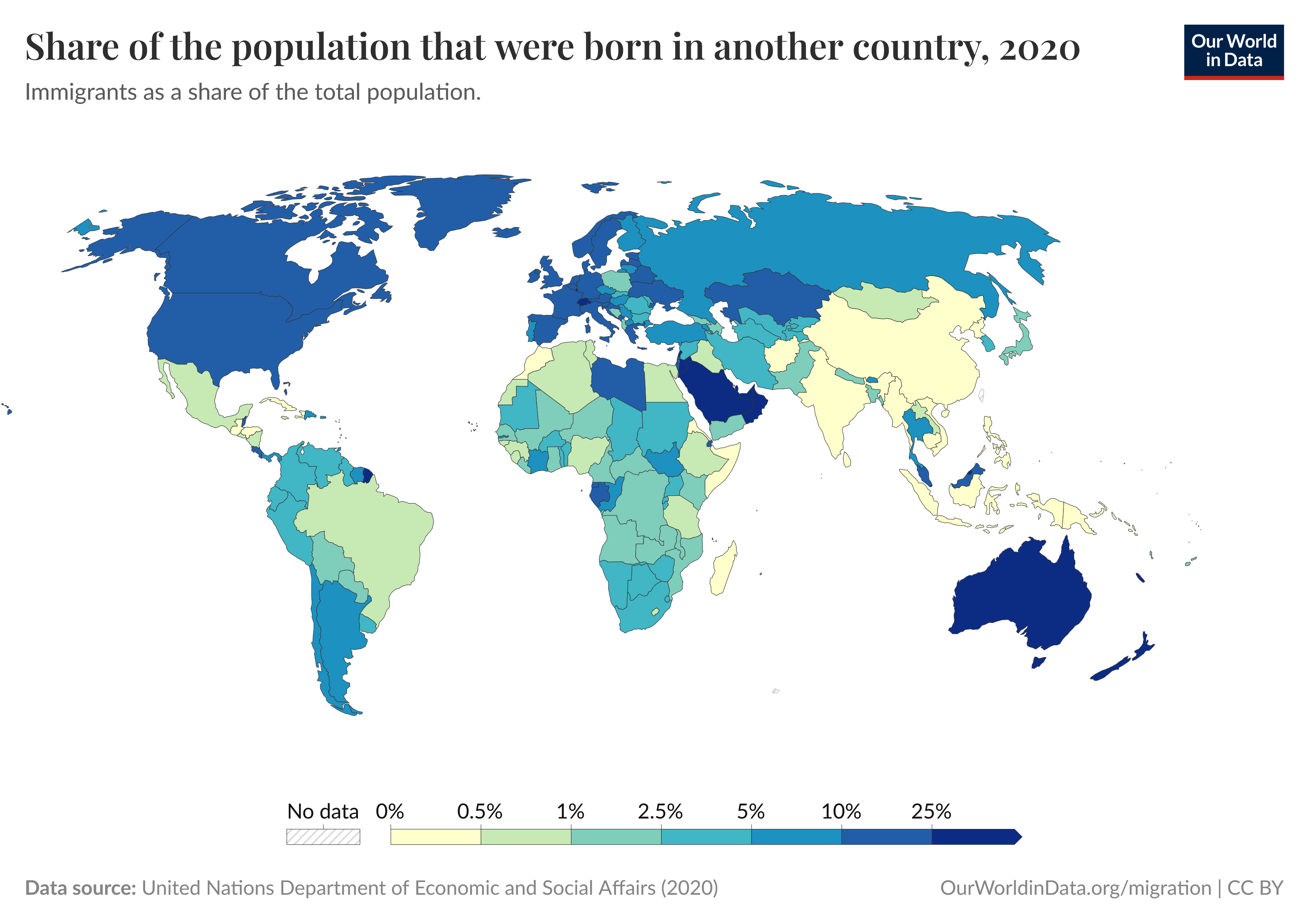
Share of population born in another country (2020, Our World in Data)

== Definition ==
The United Nations defines "foreign-born" as "born in a country other than that in which one resides" to estimate the international migrant stock, whenever this information is available. In countries lacking data on place of birth, the UN uses the country of citizenship instead.

According to the UN: "Equating international migrants with foreign citizens when estimating the migrant stock has important shortcomings. In countries where citizenship is conferred on the basis of jus sanguinis, people who were born in the country of residence may be included in the number of international migrants even though they may have never lived abroad. Conversely, persons who were born abroad and who naturalized in their country of residence are excluded from the stock of international migrants when using citizenship as the criterion to define international migrants."

== Immigrant population by destination ==
Country or territory	Immigrants 2024	Percentage of total population	Percentage female immigrants
Afghanistan	98,110	0.22	52.0
Albania	46,377	1.96	49.0
Algeria	259,458	0.55	47.2
American Samoa	23,684	47.64	49.0
Andorra	48,408	54.36	48.8
Angola	676,507	1.85	49.5
Anguilla	5,918	36.96	52.7
Antigua and Barbuda	30,473	29.41	55.4
Argentina	1,958,039	4.22	55.1
Armenia	274,645	8.93	57.0
Aruba	41,806	38.20	54.5
Australia	8,111,404	29.37	51.4
Austria	2,327,064	25.24	52.8
Azerbaijan	218,460	2.13	52.1
Bahamas	67,285	16.90	49.4
Bahrain	840,202	52.69	26.6
Bangladesh	2,906,338	1.71	48.3
Barbados	35,187	13.14	55.1
Belarus	1,054,604	11.58	54.2
Belgium	2,349,032	19.69	51.0
Belize	68,706	16.45	49.7
Benin	418,202	3.16	52.9
Bermuda	20,171	31.49	50.7
Bhutan	55,705	7.10	15.1
Bolivia	183,234	1.61	47.6
Bosnia and Herzegovina	34,120	1.00	53.2
Botswana	116,402	4.93	43.0
Brazil	1,406,299	0.66	41.8
British Virgin Islands	24,520	62.12	51.8
Brunei Darussalam	119,933	26.33	43.4
Bulgaria	299,100	4.65	52.7
Burkina Faso	739,820	3.07	52.4
Burundi	387,101	3.14	50.7
Cabo Verde	16,515	3.36	49.4
Cambodia	83,925	0.48	46.1
Cameroon	642,948	2.18	50.6
Canada	8,805,839	21.18	52.6
Caribbean	1,811,926	4.10	47.6
Cayman Islands	31,935	35.95	48.6
Central African Republic	94,556	1.46	47.6
Chad	1,269,673	6.56	55.6
Channel Islands	85,539	51.22	52.2
Chile	1,538,324	7.61	49.1
China	1,638,718	0.12	51.6
Hong Kong	3,063,318 (Note: The United Nations statistically considers people born in mainland China and Macau with the right of abode in Hong Kong as international migrants, despite the fact that they have been retroactively Chinese citizens since the Handover of Hong Kong. Hong Kong has been a special administrative region of China since 1997.)	40.70	62.6
Macau	426,862	62.17	53.6
Taiwan	1,136,425	4.88	60.5
Colombia	3,063,518	5.77	50.3
Comoros	12,449	1.35	51.6
Congo	385,589	6.28	45.5
Cook Islands	4,937	32.83	50.0
Costa Rica	628,404	12.10	49.4
Croatia	527,831	13.65	54.7
Cuba	2,144	0.02	56.6
Curaçao	80,020	51.26	56.4
Cyprus	202,062	20.56	55.0
Czechia	1,025,199	9.41	51.2
Côte d'Ivoire	2,880,839	9.08	40.0
North Korea	50,439	0.19	50.2
Democratic Republic of the Congo	1,085,090	0.96	51.8
Denmark	847,475	14.06	50.9
Djibouti	125,996	11.81	47.5
Dominica	8,440	11.73	47.9
Dominican Republic	738,667	6.86	39.8
Ecuador	747,749	4.13	51.7
Egypt	9,985,453	9.26	47.1
El Salvador	43,342	0.72	52.4
Equatorial Guinea	248,930	14.92	22.9
Eritrea	12,512	0.35	43.9
Estonia	203,046	14.90	56.5
Eswatini	33,268	2.69	48.5
Ethiopia	1,168,455	1.05	49.7
Falkland Islands	2,333	63.71	44.4
Faroe Islands	8,101	14.73	48.0
Fiji	14,362	1.59	46.0
Finland	514,432	9.09	49.2
France	12,986,757	18.80	48.5
French Guiana	130,924	43.64	52.5
French Polynesia	30,099	10.77	43.0
Gabon	449,746	18.21	35.7
Gambia	236,137	9.75	47.2
Georgia	81,582	2.20	56.1
Germany	17,750,084	21.26	50.0
Ghana	532,286	1.58	46.6
Gibraltar	11,291	29.56	49.5
Greece	1,423,964	13.73	52.1
Greenland	5,812	10.24	35.2
Grenada	7,340	6.73	54.4
Guadeloupe	89,610	22.65	58.0
Guam	84,159	54.71	48.4
Guatemala	92,732	0.51	52.7
Guinea	117,416	0.82	41.2
Guinea-Bissau	15,064	0.81	50.6
Guyana	54,175	5.67	53.5
Haiti	19,581	0.17	44.4
Vatican City	496	56.24	52.2
Honduras	39,901	0.40	47.5
Hungary	250,912	2.64	48.2
Iceland	98,818	25.05	45.4
India	4,796,255	0.34	57.1
Indonesia	445,726	0.16	46.2
Iran	3,840,654	4.44	52.0
Iraq	370,980	0.80	44.9
Ireland	1,216,237	22.28	51.9
Isle of Man	43,693	51.42	51.2
Israel	2,091,569	20.55	54.4
Italy	6,553,671	11.12	53.7
Jamaica	24,007	0.87	49.2
Japan	3,409,529	2.77	49.6
Jordan	3,480,168	29.66	44.3
Kazakhstan	2,089,797	10.20	59.3
Kenya	992,536	1.86	49.5
Kiribati	3,302	2.73	47.2
Kuwait	3,323,191	68.08	34.0
Kyrgyzstan	194,816	2.68	59.6
Laos	51,446	0.67	35.6
Latvia	220,471	12.09	59.5
Lebanon	1,422,583	25.91	49.3
Lesotho	15,039	0.71	45.8
Liberia	72,423	1.38	42.4
Libya	897,751	12.04	28.2
Liechtenstein	27,669	67.45	51.2
Lithuania	175,194	6.05	47.0
Luxembourg	344,309	50.49	49.1
Madagascar	38,625	0.12	43.0
Malawi	186,719	0.90	51.1
Malaysia	3,806,514	11.10	22.9
Maldives	75,099	14.58	12.3
Mali	545,323	2.43	49.3
Malta	199,466	34.74	42.4
Marshall Islands	3,309	7.80	38.7
Martinique	68,187	18.94	57.5
Mauritania	195,937	3.98	43.4
Mauritius	29,142	2.34	44.6
Mayotte	143,528	44.03	53.7
Mexico	1,726,089	1.32	47.3
Micronesia (Fed. States of)	2,894	2.74	46.5
Monaco	27,106	70.55	51.5
Mongolia	22,589	0.64	33.2
Montenegro	92,237	14.80	54.4
Montserrat	1,402	31.97	48.4
Morocco	111,069	0.30	48.5
Mozambique	353,143	1.04	51.2
Myanmar	79,052	0.15	45.2
Namibia	116,035	3.84	46.0
Nauru	2,548	21.82	41.1
Nepal	470,719	1.57	69.9
Netherlands	2,956,518	16.31	51.3
New Caledonia	76,738	29.00	47.7
New Zealand	1,467,989	27.48	50.9
Nicaragua	43,757	0.64	48.6
Niger	449,236	1.63	53.5
Nigeria	1,403,281	0.63	45.5
Niue	588	34.98	45.7
North Macedonia	150,902	8.28	58.0
Northern Mariana Islands	22,000	46.48	58.0
Norway	1,012,404	17.99	50.0
Oman	2,283,366	42.60	19.8
Pakistan	4,175,958	1.73	48.1
Palau	5,212	31.15	43.2
Panama	477,749	11.75	46.7
Papua New Guinea	31,171	0.31	39.2
Paraguay	180,837	2.96	47.9
Peru	1,837,219	5.35	53.8
Philippines	87,212	0.08	29.7
Poland	2,300,000	5.90	59.5
Portugal	1,127,184	10.49	52.1
Puerto Rico	223,323	7.01	53.5
Qatar	2,337,000	72.70	22.7
South Korea	2,650,783	5.19	46.9
Republic of Moldova	188,207	7.90	58.5
Romania	655,579	3.44	49.8
Russia	7,605,774	5.21	50.8
Rwanda	513,316	3.64	49.4
Réunion	135,534	15.06	49.3
Saint Helena	492	8.71	30.1
Saint Kitts and Nevis	7,958	15.51	47.4
Saint Lucia	8,079	4.39	52.0
Saint Pierre and Miquelon	1,008	17.32	47.6
Saint Vincent and the Grenadines	4,820	4.35	48.4
Samoa	3,843	1.87	49.5
San Marino	5,838	17.08	46.0
Sao Tome and Principe	1,955	0.93	50.1
Saudi Arabia	13,683,841	38.76	22.3
Senegal	281,867	1.52	47.0
Serbia	712,550	10.85	55.9
Seychelles	13,261	10.81	30.0
Sierra Leone	49,997	0.55	43.4
Singapore	2,841,665	46.51	57.1
Sint Maarten	30,148	72.91	52.1
Slovakia	323,991	5.99	61.4
Slovenia	315,122	14.77	41.4
Solomon Islands	2,469	0.33	43.9
Somalia	77,972	0.40	44.9
South Africa	2,631,100	4.17	41.9
South Sudan	914,001	5.79	49.7
Spain	9,510,527	19.19	51.7
Sri Lanka	40,698	0.19	47.3
State of Palestine	272,481	4.97	54.3
Sudan	2,397,113	4.64	50.3
Suriname	51,902	8.42	45.0
Sweden	2,272,158	21.42	52.0
Switzerland	2,503,840	27.50	50.3
Syrian Arab Republic	896,042	3.50	50.2
Tajikistan	276,777	2.64	56.8
Thailand	3,179,399	4.83	43.8
Timor-Leste	8,303	0.60	39.6
Togo	281,994	3.48	49.3
Tokelau	1,282	49.16	52.7
Tonga	3,581	3.57	45.4
Trinidad and Tobago	113,478	8.30	50.3
Tunisia	63,201	0.53	47.7
Turkmenistan	193,763	2.75	52.6
Turks and Caicos Islands	28,455	55.98	48.2
Tuvalu	246	2.31	44.7
Turkey	7,083,501	8.23	50.3
Uganda	2,057,759	4.48	55.0
Ukraine	5,064,173	17.65	57.0
United Arab Emirates	8,157,000	72.22	32.7
United Kingdom	11,845,479	17.05	48.5
United Republic of Tanzania	462,371	0.68	50.0
United States Virgin Islands	56,779	65.15	52.9
United States	52,375,047	15.32	51.1
Uruguay	160,064	4.59	52.5
Uzbekistan	1,154,963	3.02	53.2
Vanuatu	3,315	1.03	50.3
Venezuela	1,263,304	4.43	50.7
Vietnam	326,418	0.32	52.8
Wallis and Futuna Islands	2,032	17.49	49.5
Western Sahara	5,628	0.94	40.9
Yemen	392,997	1.20	42.3
Zambia	249,205	1.27	48.1
Zimbabwe	429,108	2.51	43.2

== Emigrant population ==
Countries and regions of origin by emigrant population in 2019
Country or region of origin	Emigrants	Destinations	Article
World	271,642,105		
Other South	7,950,425		
Other North	3,407,920		
Afghanistan	5,120,756	Germany, London, Scandinavia, United States, Canada	Afghan diaspora
Albania	1,207,032	Italy, Germany, London, Switzerland, Michigan, New York	Albanian diaspora
Algeria	1,944,784	France, Quebec	
American Samoa	1,817		
Andorra	9,114		
Angola	661,590	Portugal, Brazil	
Anguilla	2,707		
Antigua and Barbuda	55,089	New York City	
Argentina	1,013,414	Spain, Florida, Italy	
Armenia	964,848	California, France, Russia	Armenian diaspora
Aruba	19,640	Netherlands	
Australia	577,255	United States, UAE, Philippines, Vietnam, Japan	Australian diaspora
Austria	575,950	Germany, Switzerland	Austrians Abroad
Azerbaijan	1,155,852	Turkey, Russia, Germany	Azerbaijani diaspora
Bahamas	46,467	United States, England	
Bahrain	60,153		
Bangladesh	7,835,152	England, New York, Ontario, Japan, India, UAE	Bangladeshi diaspora
Barbados	112,925	England	
Belarus	1,480,794	Russia, Poland, United States, Latvia	Belarusian diaspora
Belgium	581,740	France, Canada, England	
Belize	68,144	United States	
Benin	666,357	France	
Bermuda	18,049	United States, England	
Bhutan	49,216		
Bolivia (Plurinational State of)	878,211	Brazil, Argentina, Spain, United States	
Bonaire, Sint Eustatius and Saba	12,764		
Bosnia and Herzegovina	1,653,056	Germany, Switzerland, Sweden, Turkey, Austria	Bosnian diaspora
Botswana	86,501	South Africa	
Brazil	4,996,951	United States, Portugal, London, Netherlands, Germany, Australia, New Zealand, Canada, Uruguay, Italy, Switzerland, Paris, Spain	Brazilian diaspora
British Virgin Islands	5,417		
Brunei Darussalam	46,977		
Bulgaria	1,541,860	Germany, Spain, Turkey	Bulgarian diaspora
Burkina Faso	1,581,083	France, Ivory Coast	
Burundi	623,999		
Cabo Verde	186,372	Boston, Rhode Island, Portugal, France, Rotterdam	
Cambodia	1,097,884	Vietnam, Australia, Paris	
Cameroon	383,029	France, United States, Gabon, Chad, Nigeria, Germany, United Kingdom, Belgium, Canada, Ivory Coast, Sweden, Italy	Cameroonian diaspora
Canada	1,323,087	United States, London, Australia, Hong Kong, Japan	Canadian diaspora
Cayman Islands	1,973		
Central African Republic	767,884	France	
Chad	206,400	France	
Channel Islands	22,545	England	
Chile	650,151	Spain	
China	10,732,281	United States, United Kingdom, France, Canada, Australia, Hong Kong, Japan, Spain, Italy, Brazil, Indonesia, Malaysia, Angola, South Korea, Panama	Chinese diaspora
Hong Kong	1,110,358	United Kingdom, Canada, United States	Emigration from Hong Kong
Macau	161,930		
Colombia	2,869,032	United States, Spain	Colombian diaspora
Comoros	120,297	France	
Congo	239,397	France	
Cook Islands	22,488	New Zealand	
Costa Rica	150,400	Spain	
Côte d'Ivoire	1,114,003	France, Quebec, London	
Croatia	990,012	Germany, Switzerland, United States, Australia, Canada, Austria	Croatian diaspora
Cuba	1,654,684	Florida, New York, Spain	Cuban diaspora
Curaçao	123,132	Netherlands	
Cyprus	214,648	London, United States, Australia	Greek Cypriot diaspora
Czech Republic	911,388	Germany, England, United States, Canada	Czech diaspora
North Korea	113,118		Korean diaspora
Democratic Republic of the Congo	1,684,615	Belgium, France	
Denmark	255,616	Germany, Sweden, Norway, United States	
Djibouti	18,668		
Dominica	78,634	Antigua and Barbuda	
Dominican Republic	1,558,668	United States, Spain, Italy, American Virgins	
Ecuador	1,183,685	United States, London, Spain, Italy, Lausanne	Emigration from Ecuador
Egypt	3,547,626	England, United States, Saudi Arabia, UAE	Egyptian diaspora
El Salvador	1,600,739	United States, Milan	
Equatorial Guinea	125,670	Spain	
Eritrea	751,481	Switzerland, Sweden, Germany, London	
Estonia	208,257	Finland	
Eswatini	108,188	South Africa	
Ethiopia	871,747	London, Washington D. C., Canada, Germany, Scandinavia	
Falkland Islands	1,623		
Faroe Islands	13,838	Denmark	
Fiji	222,633	Australia, United States, United Kingdom, New Zealand	
Finland	290,006	United States, Sweden	Finnish diaspora
France	2,296,534	Quebec, Spain, United States, London, New Caledonia	French diaspora
French Guiana	4,555	France	
French Polynesia	1,982	New Zealand	
Gabon	46,684	France	
Gambia	118,483	United States, United Kingdom	
Georgia	852,816	United States, Turkey, Iran	Georgian diaspora
Germany	4,014,203	United States, Switzerland, Canada, United Kingdom, Turkey, Kyrgyzstan, Namibia, Argentina, Australia	German diaspora
Ghana	970,625	United States, United Kingdom, Germany, Italy	
Gibraltar	14,320		
Greece	1,039,257	Germany, United States, Canada, Australia, Netherlands, Sweden, London	Greek diaspora
Greenland	18,684		
Grenada	75,784	Barbados, United States, United Kingdom	
Guadeloupe	11,856	France	
Guam	2,197	United States	
Guatemala	1,205,644	United States	
Guinea	530,963	France	
Guinea-Bissau	103,587	Portugal	
Guyana	520,196	New York City, United Kingdom	
Haiti	1,585,681	Florida, Massachusetts, New York, France, Belgium, Dominican Rep., Quebec	
Holy See	217		
Honduras	800,707	United States, Spain	
Hungary	632,126	Germany, United States	Hungarian diaspora
Iceland	42,186	United States, Canada	Icelandic diaspora
India	17,510,931	United States, United Kingdom, UAE, Canada, Qatar, Eindhoven, Basel, Australia, New Zealand, Japan, Sri Lanka, Singapore, Fiji, Guyana, Saint Kitts and Nevis, Malaysia	Indian diaspora
Indonesia	4,532,992	Netherlands, Hong Kong, Japan, California, Singapore	Indonesian diaspora
Iran	4,037,258	California, Germany, London, Sweden, Norway, Bahrain	Iranian diaspora
Iraq	2,033,522	United States, London, Germany, Scandinavia	Iraqi diaspora
Ireland	816,797	United Kingdom, United States, Australia, Canada	Irish diaspora
Isle of Man	12,809	United Kingdom	
Israel	369,935	New York City, Canada, Moscow, Ukraine	Yordim
Italy	3,077,777	Germany, France, Barcelona, London, Ontario, United States, Australia	Italian diaspora
Jamaica	1,111,021	New York City, Atlanta, Florida, United Kingdom, Canada, Antigua and Barbuda	Jamaican diaspora
Japan	838,852	United States, London, Canada, Australia, New Zealand, Federated States of Micronesia, Dusseldorf, Brazil	Japanese diaspora
Jordan	784,377		
Kazakhstan	45,587	Russia,China	
Kenya	525,437	London, United States	
Kiribati	4,370		
Kuwait	205,382	United States, United Kingdom	Kuwaiti diaspora
Kyrgyzstan	754,969	Russia, China	
Lao People's Democratic Republic	1,347,034	Minnesota, Wisconsin, France	Laotian diaspora
Latvia	332,220	London, Scandinavia, Germany	Latvian diaspora
Lebanon	844,158	Michigan, Canada, Paris, Scandinavia, Australia, Germany	Lebanese diaspora
Lesotho	341,580	South Africa	
Liberia	219,338	United States	
Libya	180,586		
Liechtenstein	3,713		
Lithuania	610,223	London, Scandinavia	
Luxembourg	75,470	Germany, France, United States	
Madagascar	184,762	France	
Malawi	324,541	South Africa	
Malaysia	1,689,222	United Kingdom, United States, Australia	Malaysian diaspora
Maldives	3,053		Maldivian diaspora
Mali	1,264,700	France	
Malta	111,137	Australia	Emigration from Malta
Marshall Islands	8,205	Hawaii	
Martinique	13,919	France	
Mauritania	128,506	France, Spain	
Mauritius	188,344	United Kingdom, France, Australia	
Mayotte	6,617	France	
Mexico	11,796,178	United States	Emigration from Mexico
Micronesia (Fed. States of)	21,819	United States	
Monaco	31,452		
Mongolia	73,488	Russia, China, South Korea	Mongolian diaspora
Montenegro	153,009	United States, Germany, Serbia	
Montserrat	22,838	United Kingdom	
Morocco	3,136,069	France, Spain, Belgium, Netherlands, Italy, Frankfurt am Main, Quebec	Moroccan diaspora
Mozambique	1,013,416	Portugal, South Africa	
Myanmar	3,699,472	United States, Japan, Australia	Burmese diaspora
Namibia	195,515	South Africa	
Nauru	2,421		
Nepal	2,285,364	United States, London, Australia, Malaysia, Lisbon	Nepalese diaspora
Netherlands	980,753	United States, Australia, Canada, New Zealand, Germany	Dutch diaspora
New Caledonia	5,098	France	
New Zealand	777,303	Australia	
Nicaragua	682,865	United States, Costa Rica, Spain	
Niger	401,653		
Nigeria	1,438,331	United States, United Kingdom, Germany, Netherlands	Nigerian diaspora
Niue	5,593		
North Macedonia	658,264	Germany, Switzerland, Turkey	Macedonian diaspora
Northern Mariana Islands	2,764		
Norway	202,336	United States, Canada	Norwegian diaspora
Oman	24,939		
Pakistan	6,303,286	United Kingdom, Qatar, UAE, United States, Germany, Norway, Barcelona, Australia	Pakistani diaspora
Palau	2,650		
Panama	161,107	United States	
Papua New Guinea	219,126	Australia	
Paraguay	871,638	Brazil, United States	
Peru	3,505,511	United States, Spain, Italy, Argentina	
Philippines	5,377,337	United States, Saudi Arabia, Canada, Australia, UAE, Japan, Hong Kong, Italy, London, Northern Ireland	Overseas Filipinos
Poland	1,500,000	United States, United Kingdom, Argentina, Norway, Netherlands, Germany, Ireland	Polish diaspora
Portugal	2,631,559	Massachusetts, Rhode Island, California, Germany, Switzerland	
Puerto Rico	5,807,347	United States	Puerto Rican diaspora (Note: The United Nations statistically considers people born in the archipelago and island of Puerto Rico and living in the 50 states of the United States as international migrants, despite the fact that they have been U.S. citizens since the enactment of the Jones–Shafroth Act in 1917. Puerto Rico has been an unincorporated territory of the United States since 1898.)
Qatar	171,632	London, New York City	
Republic of Moldova	1,013,417	Italy, Spain, Portugal	Moldovan diaspora
Réunion	133,769	France	
Romania	3,572,794	United Kingdom, Ireland, Spain, Italy, Germany, United States	Romanian diaspora
Russia	10,491,715	United States, United Kingdom, Germany, Spain, Italy, UAE, Canada, Turkey, China, Czech Rep.	Russian diaspora
Rwanda	588,544		
Saint Helena	6,596		
Saint Kitts and Nevis	124,941	United States, United Kingdom	
Saint Lucia	63,605		
Saint Pierre and Miquelon	2,356		
Saint Vincent and the Grenadines	60,655	United States	
Samoa	124,403	New Zealand	
San Marino	2,425		
Sao Tome and Principe	37,013		
Saudi Arabia	296,254	United States, London	
Senegal	642,654	France, United States	
Serbia	950,485	Germany, Switzerland, United States, Austria	Serbian diaspora
Seychelles	36,788	France, England	
Sierra Leone	187,102	London, United States	
Singapore	340,751	United States, England, Australia, New Zealand	Overseas Singaporean
Sint Maarten	29,209		
Slovakia	345,683	Germany, United States	Slovak diaspora
Slovenia	147,593	Austria, United States	Slovene diaspora
Solomon Islands	4,234		
Somalia	2,054,377	Sweden, United Kingdom, Minnesota, Canada, Norway, Germany	Somali diaspora
South Africa	824,601	United Kingdom, Netherlands, Canada, Australia	South African diaspora
South Korea	2,176,580	United States, London, Canada, Australia, New Zealand	Korean diaspora
South Sudan	2,608,218	Australia, United States	South Sudanese diaspora
Spain	1,444,942	France, Germany, Switzerland	Spanish diaspora
Sri Lanka	1,775,768	London, Canada, Australia, Japan, Palermo, Lucerne, Paris	Sri Lankan diaspora
State of Palestine	3,890,650	Belgium, United States, Canada, Chile	Palestinian diaspora
Sudan	2,040,613	London, United States, Australia	
Suriname	423,517	Netherlands	
Sweden	353,825	United States, Canada	Swedish diaspora
Switzerland	679,796	Germany, France, United States	Swiss abroad
Syria	8,225,499	Germany, United States, Netherlands, Sweden, Antigua and Barbuda, Brazil, Turkey, Lebanon	Syrian diaspora
Tajikistan	597,959	Russia, China	
Thailand	1,020,119	United States, Japan, United Kingdom, Australia, New Zealand	
Timor-Leste	39,202		
Togo	543,277	France	
Tokelau	2,242		
Tonga	74,433	United States, Australia	
Trinidad and Tobago	334,304	United States, United Kingdom	
Tunisia	813,213	France, Italy	
Turkey	3,493,071	Germany, London, Netherlands, France, Belgium, Switzerland, Austria, Sweden, Krasnodar Krai, Northern Cyprus	Turkish diaspora
Turkmenistan	260,832	Iran, Turkey	
Turks and Caicos Islands	31,033		
Tuvalu	3,276		
Uganda	734,951	London	
Ukraine	5,901,067	Germany, American Midwest, Spain, Poland, Canada, Russia	Ukrainian diaspora
United Arab Emirates	154,404	London, United States	Emirati diaspora
United Kingdom	4,274,998	United States, Canada, Australia, New Zealand, UAE, Cyprus, Caribbean	British diaspora
United Republic of Tanzania	323,173	London	
United States	4,779,929	Philippines, Mexico, Portugal, London, Germany, Canada, Australia, Brazil, Hong Kong, UAE, Ireland	American diaspora
United States Virgin Islands	25,863	United States	
Uruguay	633,439	Spain, Brazil	Emigration from Uruguay
Uzbekistan	1,979,523	Russia, Persian Gulf, New York City	
Vanuatu	7,346		
Venezuela (Bolivarian Republic of)	2,519,780	Florida, Spain, Italy, Colombia	Venezuelan diaspora
Vietnam	2,683,954	United States, Canada, France, Japan, Australia, Czech Rep., Germany, Russia, Poland	Overseas Vietnamese
Wallis and Futuna Islands	11,820		
Western Sahara	195,572		
Yemen	1,267,610	London, Michigan	Yemeni diaspora
Zambia	493,087	South Africa	
Zimbabwe	933,654	United Kingdom, Australia, South Africa	Zimbabwean diaspora

== See also ==
- List of countries by ethnic and cultural diversity level
- List of U.S. states and territories by immigrant population
- List of diasporas
