= Kuwaiti diaspora =

Kuwaiti diaspora الكويتيون المغتربون
الكويتيون المغتربون

Total population
- 167,850

Regions with significant populations
- Saudi Arabia: 50,282
- United States: 35,525
- United Kingdom: 10,000
- United Arab Emirates: 5,200
- Canada: 4,800
- Egypt: 4,000
- France: 3,100
- Jordan: 2,605
- Germany: 2,400
- Australia: 2,000
- Malaysia: 1,800
- India: 1,200
- Bahrain: 854
- Qatar: 62
- Oman: 16

Languages
- Arabic (Kuwaiti Arabic, Gulf Arabic, Standard)

Religion
- Islam (majority Sunni, minority Shia) and Christianity

Related ethnic groups
- Kuwaitis

The Kuwaiti diaspora refers to Kuwaiti nationals and their descendants living outside Kuwait. Unlike many other nations, Kuwait has a relatively small diaspora due to its generous welfare system, high standard of living, and limited push factors for emigration. However, Kuwaitis abroad—especially students, professionals, and entrepreneurs—play important roles in cultural exchange, diplomacy, and global development.

== Geographic distribution ==
Kuwait’s population is approximately 5 million, with expatriates making up nearly 70%. The Kuwaiti diaspora itself remains relatively small but is globally dispersed.

Most Kuwaitis abroad reside in neighboring Gulf Cooperation Council (GCC) countries such as Saudi Arabia, the United Arab Emirates, and Qatar, where cultural and economic ties facilitate mobility.

In South Asia, some Kuwaitis have ancestral connections to India and Pakistan, particularly through historical trade and migration routes.

Southeast Asia, especially Malaysia and Indonesia, has seen a rise in Kuwaiti students and tourists, drawn by educational opportunities and cultural affinity.

In North America, the United States hosts over 14,000 Kuwaiti students, many of whom are supported by government scholarships and active student unions.

Europe is home to Kuwaiti diplomats, students, and business people, particularly in the United Kingdom, France, and Germany. Bilateral relations and visa agreements have facilitated this presence.

== Migration trends ==
Kuwait’s net migration fluctuates significantly year to year, reflecting changes in labor demand and regional geopolitics. In 2024, Kuwait recorded a net migration of 61,624, marking a 23.2% increase from the previous year.

== Education abroad ==
Thousands of Kuwaiti students pursue degrees in North America, Europe, and Asia, often supported by government scholarships. Kuwait University’s Student Exchange Program (SEP) facilitates academic exchanges with global institutions. Studies show that factors such as language proficiency and international exposure influence students’ decisions to study abroad.

== Business and entrepreneurship ==
Kuwaiti expatriates have launched successful ventures in finance, technology, and retail across major global cities. Their contributions not only generate economic value but also strengthen Kuwait’s global business reputation.

== Cultural diplomacy ==
Kuwaitis abroad often serve as cultural ambassadors, promoting Kuwaiti heritage through exhibitions, performances, and culinary events. Initiatives like the EU-Kuwait Culture Forum highlight Kuwait’s commitment to intercultural dialogue. Traditional practices such as the Diwaniya have also been adapted abroad to foster community and diplomacy.

== Humanitarian engagement ==
Members of the Kuwaiti diaspora are active in humanitarian efforts, supporting causes ranging from disaster relief to educational access. Organizations like the Kuwait-America Foundation and Kuwait Fund for Arab Economic Development channel resources to global initiatives.

== See also ==
- Kuwait–United States relations
- Expatriates in Kuwait
- Kerala Gulf diaspora
