= List of shopping malls in Kuwait =

This is a list of shopping malls in Kuwait, ordered by governorate:

== Ahmadi Governorate ==
Abu Halifa

- Dome Complex
- Kuwait Magic
- Sea View
- The Lane (previously Al Ashira Mall)

Egaila

- 58 Mall
- 89 Mall
- Al Bairaq Mall
- Al Dowaiq Complex
- Al Mouj Complex
- Arabia Mall
- Awtad Mall
- Dalal Mall
- Daree Center
- Dora Mall
- Liwan Mall
- Mecca Mall
- Sama Mall
- Taiba Mall
- The Gate Mall

Fahaheel

- Ajial Complex
- Al Anoud Complex
- Al Kout Mall
- Fahaheel Bazaar
- Yaal Mall

Mahboula

- CRE Mall
- Levels Complex
- Light Restaurant Complex
- Massaleh Restaurant Complex
- Sidra Complex
- Spoons Food Complex
- The Coast
- Wafra Seef

Mangaf

- Mangaf Commercial Complex Area (Block 4)

Sabah Al Ahmad Sea City

- Al Khiran Mall
- Blue Water Mall
- Jalboot Village
- Khiran Square
- Norma Mall

South Sabahiya

- The Warehouse Mall

== Asimah/Capital Governorate ==
Da'iya

- Hessah Plaza

Doha/Sulaibikhat

- The Palm Mall

Kuwait City
Mirqab

- Al-Awqaaf Complex
- Al Hamad Commercial Complex
- Al Tijaria Tower
- Assima Mall
- Baitak Mall
- Discovery Mall (closed; 2009-2020)
- Souq Al Safafeer
- Souq Al Wataniya

Sharq

- Al Hamra Commercial Tower
- Arraya Center
- Behbehani Complex
- Dasman Complex
- Khaleejia Square
- Sanabil Tower
- Souq Sharq (closed; 1998-2026)

Qibla

- Al Muthana Complex
- Souq Al Kabeer
- Souq Al Safat
- Souq Al Watiya
- Souq Blockat
- SOMU - Souq Mubarakiya

Shuwaikh Industrial
Shuwaikh Industrial Area - 1

- A5 Mall
- Al Tilal Mall
- Auto Mall
- CDC - Creative Design Center
- Shuwaikh 125 Mall
- Shuwaikh Market
- Suncity Complex
- Wara Center

Shuwaikh Industrial Area - 2

- 55 Mall
- Al Hayat Commercial Complex
- Design District Kuwait | Premium Lifestyle Shopping Center
- Plaza Complex
- Shuwaikh Mall
- Special Mall
- Zeina Center

Shuwaikh Industrial Area - 3

- Alwazzan Corner Complex
- Manara Mall
- White Complex

== Farwaniya Governorate ==
Airport

- T2 Terminal - Airport Mall

Ardiya

- The Walk Mall

Dajeej

- 31 Avenue
- 37 Complex
- Al Arbeed Center
- Al Faisal Mall
- Al Sayer Commercial Complex
- Aliya Commercial Complex
- Basma Center
- Boubyan Complex
- City Star HyperMarket
- Dajeej 93 Mall (under construction)
- Dajeej Waves
- Dalal Center
- Fahad Complex
- Galleria
- Hadi Center
- Homz Mall
- Lulu HyperMarket
- Mark & Save Hyper Store
- Plaza One
- Suhaib Center
- Tala Mall
- The Terminal Mall
- TSC - Sultan
- Sky Mall
- Waha Mall

Farwaniya

- Fahad Ghesham AlBasman Complex
- Magatheer Mall
- Metro Complex

Jleeb Al-Shuyoukh

- Jleeb Al-Shuyoukh Commercial Complex Area (Block 1)
- Souk Al Jaleeb

Khaitan

- Al Burooj Complex
- Al Rajaan Complex
- Al Sharqiya Mall
- Alhout Mall
- Awtad Complex
- Hajer complex
- Hawazen complex
- Nasser Al-Jeaan Commercial Complex
- Salman Al Abdallah Al Dabbous
- Sama Khaitan Mall
- Trio Mall
- Zeina Complex

Rai

- The Avenues

== Hawalli Governorate ==
Hawalli

- Al Bahar Center
- Al Mohalab Mall
- Al Rehab Complex (for gaming stores)
- Al Rifaei Complex
- Al Sumait Plaza
- eMall
- The Promenade Mall

Ministries Zone

- Al Shuhada Mall

Salam

- Al Salam Mall

Salmiya

- Al Bustan Mall
- Al Fanar Mall
- Al Munira Complex
- Al Salam Mall
- Boulevard Mall
- Central Plaza
- Dana Center
- Galleria 2000
- Laila Gallery
- Marina Mall
- Northern Salmieh Building complex
- Olympia Mall
- Salmiya Souq
- Terrace Mall
- Thuraya Mall
- The Cube Mall
- The View Mall
- The Walk
- Wataniya Complex
- Zahra Complex
- Zain Commercial Complex

Zahra

- 360 Mall
- Zahra Complex

== Jahra Governorate ==
Al Jahra

- Al Alamia Mall
- Al Manar Mall
- Al Sultan Palace Complex
- Awtad Mall
- Jahra Mall
- Mutlaa Al Jahra Mall
- Qaser Al Sultan
- Sahari Mall
- Saleel Al Jahra
- Sama Jahra Mall
- Wafi Complex
- Wara Complex

Al-Mutlaa

- Beyout Plus (under construction)

Jaber Al Ahmad

- Aventura Mall (under construction)
- Jaber Mall (under construction)

== Mubarak Al-Kabeer Governorate ==
Abu Hassaniya

- Active Arena
- Darah Mall
- Dine Zone
- Divonne Complex
- Mall 30
- Tasters
- The Dining
- The Lake
- The Port
- The Village
- The Yard
- Vibes

Al-Masayel

- The Spot Complex

Aswaq Qurain/West Abu Fatira Herfiya

- Commercial Shopping Area

Sabah Al-Salem

- Al Areen Complex
- Pixel Complex

Wista

- Murouj
