= Freedom of religion in Kuwait =

The Constitution of Kuwait provides for religious freedom, including the freedom of belief and freedom of religious practice. According to the constitution, Islam is the state religion and Sharia is a source of legislation. In general, citizens were open and tolerant of other religious groups. Regional events contributed to increased sectarian tensions between Sunnis and Shia.

In 2023, Kuwait was scored 2 out of 4 for religious freedom; blasphemy is a punishable offence and non-Muslims are forbidden from proselytizing.

== Religious demography ==
In 2019, 74.57% of the population were Muslim, 17.93% were Christian and 7.48% were 'other', mainly Hindus and Buddhists; there were also a small number of Ahmadi Muslims in Kuwait.

In 2014, there were 259 Christian Kuwaiti citizens residing in Kuwait. There is also a small number of Baháʼí Kuwaiti citizens. An estimated 150,000 noncitizen residents are Shia. While some areas have relatively high concentrations of either Sunnis or Shia, most areas are religiously well integrated.

There are an estimated 600,000 non-citizen Hindus. The non‑citizen Christian population is estimated to be more than 450,000. The government-recognized Christian churches include the Roman Catholic Church, the Coptic Orthodox Church, the National Evangelical Church Kuwait, the Armenian Apostolic Church, the Greek (Rūm) Orthodox Church, the Greek (Rūm) Catholic Church, and the Anglican Church. There are also many unrecognized Christian religious groups with smaller populations. There are an estimated 100,000 Buddhists, 10,000 Sikhs, and 400 Bahais, the majority of whom are non-citizens.

== Status of religious freedom ==
=== Legal and policy framework ===
The constitution provides for "absolute freedom" of belief and for freedom of religious practice. The constitution states that Islam is the state religion.

The law requires jail terms for journalists convicted of defaming any religion and prohibits denigration of Islam and Judeo-Christian religious figures, including Muhammad and Jesus. The law prohibits publications that the government deems could create hatred, spread dissension among the public, or incite persons to commit crimes.

The government has Islamic religion studies in public schools for all students. Non-Muslim students are not required to attend these classes. High school Islamic education textbooks are based largely on the Sunni interpretation of Islam.

The government does not designate religion on passports or national identity documents, with the exception of birth certificates. On birth certificates issued to Muslims, the government does not differentiate between Sunnis and Shia.

The Ministry of Awqaf and Islamic Affairs is officially responsible for overseeing religious groups. The procedures for registering and licensing religious groups are similar to those for NGOs. There are seven officially recognized churches: the National Evangelical, Catholic, Coptic Orthodox, Armenian Orthodox, Greek Orthodox, Greek Catholic, and Anglican churches. They work with a variety of government entities in conducting their affairs. These include the Ministry of Social Affairs and Labor for visas and residence permits for clergy and other staff, the Ministry of Foreign Affairs and Municipality of Kuwait for building permits and land concerns, and the Ministry of Interior for security and police protection of places of worship. The government imposes quotas on the number of clergy and staff officially recognized religious groups can bring into the country.

Religious courts administer personal status law. Shia Muslims follow their own jurisprudence in matters of personal status and family law at the first instance and appellate levels. In 2003 the government approved a Shia request to establish a court of cassation to oversee Shia personal status issues. The court is not yet established. An independent Islamic charity administers Shia religious endowments.

=== Government Practices ===
Government restrictions primarily affected non-Sunni citizens and residents. Municipal authorities became more active in obstructing religious gatherings at unofficial, private spaces.

Kuwait does not have Shia religious training institutions for clergy. Kuwaiti Shias who wanted to serve as imams had to seek training and education abroad (primarily in Iraq, Iran, and to a lesser degree Syria) due to the lack of Shia jurisprudence courses at Kuwait University's College of Islamic Law, the country's only institution to train imams.

The government exercised direct control of Sunni religious institutions. The government appointed Sunni imams, monitored their Friday sermons, and financed construction of Sunni mosques. In some instances, Sunni imams were suspended for delivering sermons whose content the government deemed inflammatory. The government did not exert this control over Shia mosques, which the Shia community, not the government, funded.

Shia worshipers gathered peacefully in public spaces to attend sermons and eulogies during Ashura and the government provided security to Shia neighborhoods. However, the government did not permit self-flagellation (public reenactments) of the martyrdom of Hussein.

While seven Christian churches were legally recognized, others were not, including the Indian Orthodox, Mar Thoma, The Church of Jesus Christ of Latter‑day Saints (Mormons), and Seventh-day Adventist Church. These religious groups freely operated in rented villas, private homes, or the facilities of recognized churches. Members of these congregations reported that they were able to worship without government interference provided they did not disturb their neighbors or violate laws.

Shia were represented in the police force and some branches of the military/security apparatus, although not in all branches and often not in leadership positions. Some Shia alleged that a "glass ceiling" of discrimination prevented them from obtaining leadership positions in some of these organizations. However, since 2006 the prime minister has appointed two Shia ministers to each cabinet, including the current one. The emir had several senior-level Shia advisors.

== Status of Societal Respect for Religious Freedom ==
Many hotels, stores, and other businesses patronized by both citizens and non-citizens openly acknowledged non-Muslim holidays such as Christmas, Easter, and Diwali. During the Christmas season, stores, malls, and homes were decorated with Christmas trees and lights, and Christmas music, including songs with explicitly Christian lyrics, was broadcast in public spaces and on the radio. Christian holiday decorations were widely available for purchase. None of the many stores that had Christmas-themed displays reported negative incidents. The news media regularly printed reports of religious holiday celebrations, including large supplement sections detailing the religious significance of Christmas.

== See also ==
- Religion in Kuwait
- Human rights in Kuwait
