= Highly accelerated stress audit =

HASA (highly accelerated stress audit) is a proven test method developed to find manufacturing/production process induced defects in electronics and electro-mechanical assemblies before those products are released to market. HASA is a form of HASS (highly accelerated stress screening) – a powerful testing tool for improving product reliability, reducing warranty costs and increasing customer satisfaction.

Since HASS levels are more aggressive than conventional screening tools, a POS procedure is used to establish the effectiveness in revealing production induced defects. A POS is vital to determine that the HASS stresses are capable of revealing production defects, but not so extreme as to remove significant life from the test item. Instituting HASS to screen the product is an excellent tool to maintain a high level of robustness and it will reduce the test time required to screen a product resulting in long term savings. Ongoing HASS screening assures that any weak components or manufacturing process degradations are quickly detected and corrected. HASS is not intended to be a rigid process that has an endpoint. It is a dynamic process that may need modification or adjustment over the life of the product.

HASS aids in the detection of early life failures. HASA's primary purpose is to monitor manufacturing and prevent any defects from being introduced during the process. A carefully determined HASA sampling plan must be designed that will quickly signal when process quality has been degraded.
