= Demographics of Kuwait =

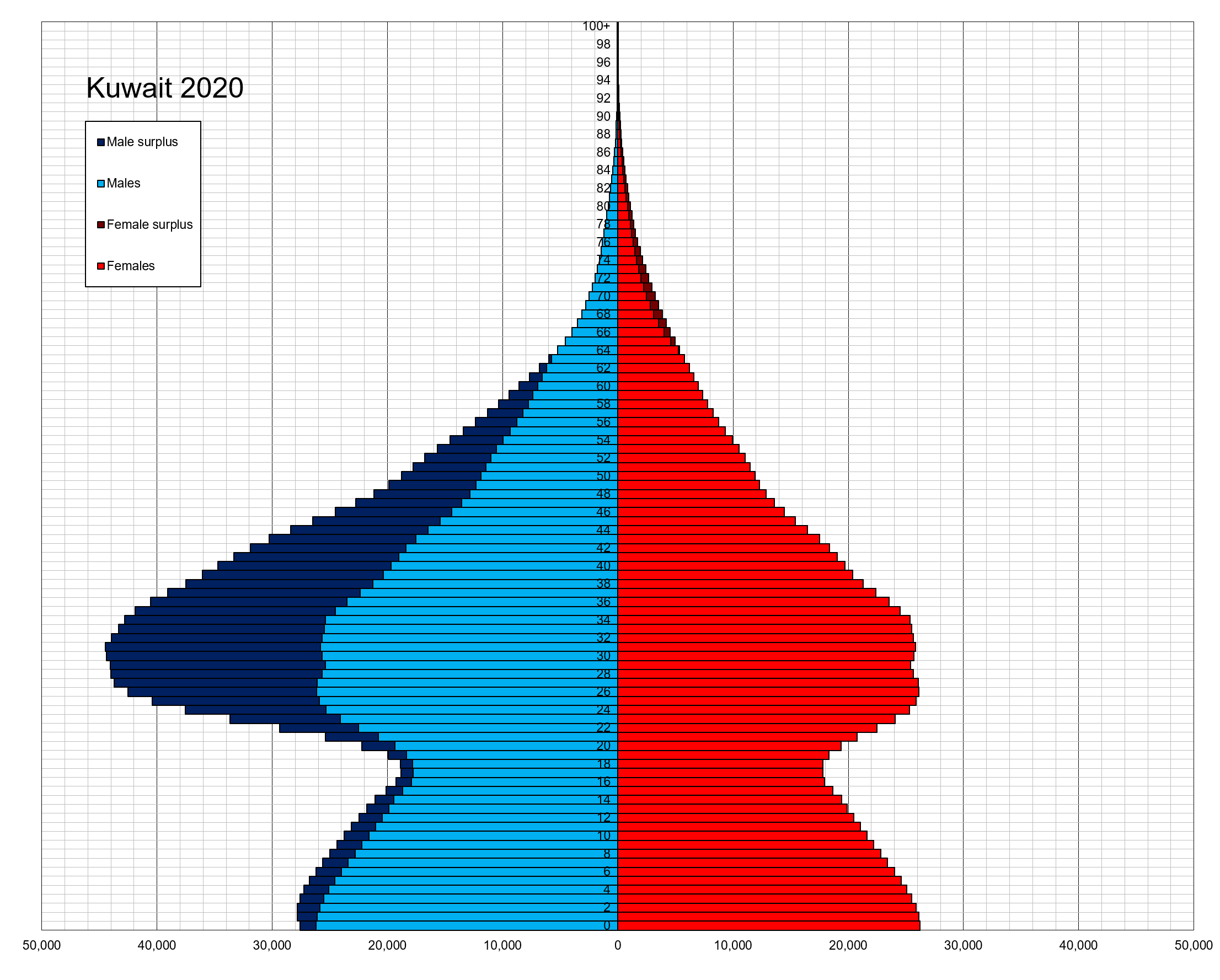
- Population pyramid of Kuwait in 2020
- Population: 3,068,155 (2022 est.)
- Growth rate: 1.17% (2022 est.)
- Birth rate: 17.78 births/1,000 population (2022 est.)
- Death rate: 2.25 deaths/1,000 population (2022 est.)
- Life expectancy: 79.13 years
  - male: 77.67 years
  - female: 80.65 years
- Fertility rate: 2.24 children born/woman (2022 est.)
- Infant mortality: 7.43 deaths/1,000 live births
- Net migration rate: −3.87 migrant(s)/1,000 population (2022 est.)
- Immigrant share: 67.3% (2024)

Age structure
- 0–14 years: 19.49%
- 15–64 years: 76.71%
- 65 and over: 3.80%

Sex ratio
- Total: 1.37 male(s)/female (2022 est.)
- At birth: 1.05 male(s)/female
- Under 15: 1.09 male(s)/female
- 65 and over: 0.66 male(s)/female

Nationality
- Nationality: Kuwaiti

Language
- Official: Arabic

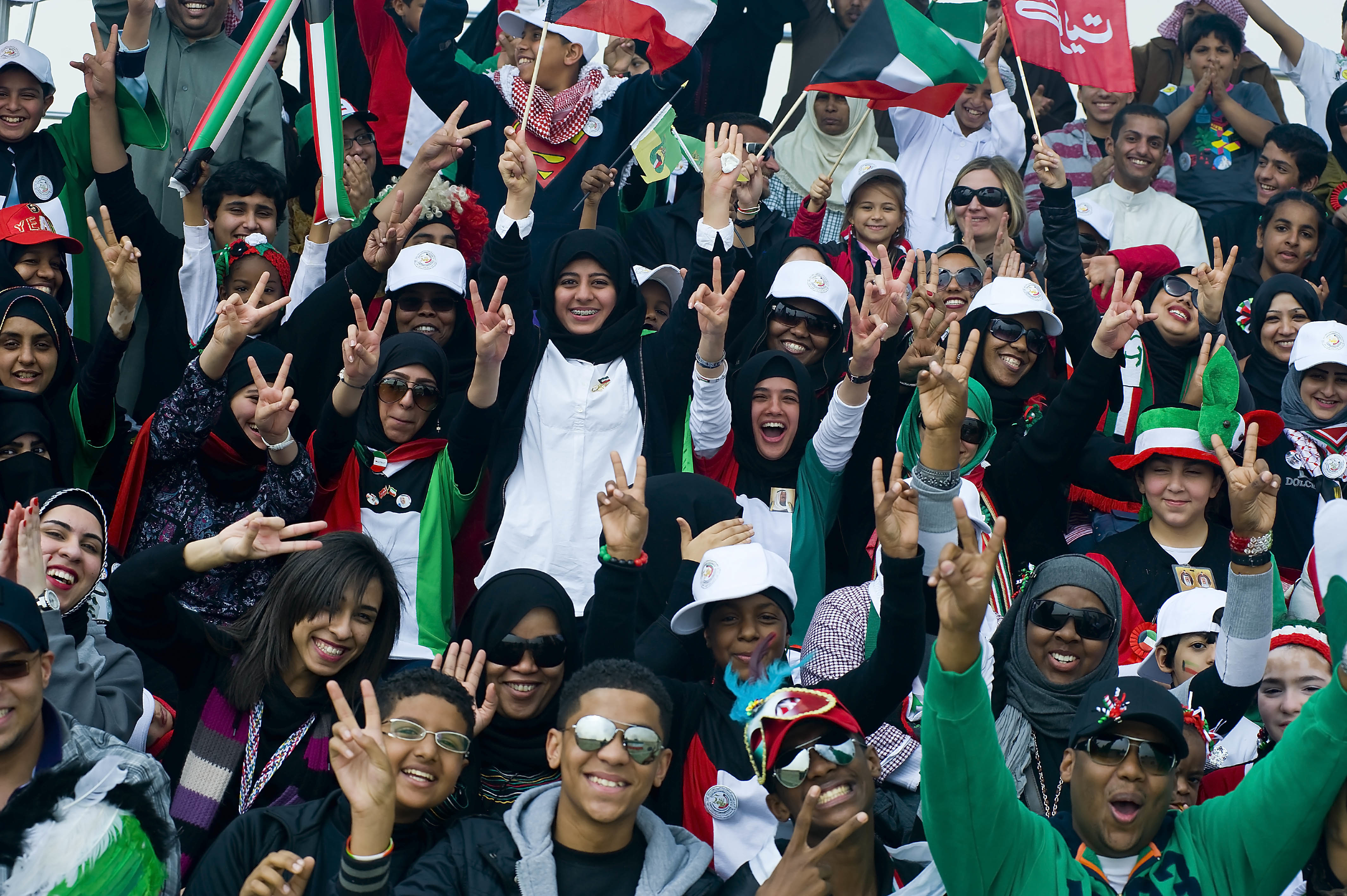
Crowd of Kuwaiti spectators

This is a demography of the population of Kuwait (Arabic: سكان الكويت).

Expatriates account for around 60% of Kuwait's total population, with Kuwaitis constituting 38–42% of the total population. The government and some Kuwaiti citizens consider the proportion of expatriates (which has been relatively stable since the mid-1970s) to be a problem, and in 2016 the number of deportations increased. Most were deported for outstaying their residency permits but others also for traffic offences.

== Population size and structure ==
Historical population
Year	Pop.	±% p.a.
1950	152,000	—
1960	264,000	+5.68%
1970	753,000	+11.05%
1980	1,377,000	+6.22%
1990	2,088,000	+4.25%
2000	1,941,000	−0.73%
2010	2,737,000	+3.50%
2020	4,464,000	+5.01%

Population of Kuwait according to nationality
Census year	Kuwaiti		non-Kuwaiti		Total	Change
Census year	Population	%	Population	%	Population	%
1975	307,755	30.9%	687,082	69.1%	994,837	—N/a
1985	470,473	27.7%	1,226,828	72.3%	1,697,301	70.6
1995	653,616	41.5%	921,954	58.5%	1,575,570	−7.2
2005	860,324	39.2%	1,333,327	60.8%	2,193,651	39.2
2015	1,208,643	32.3%	2,535,017	67.7%	3,743,660	70.6

Year	Kuwaiti Male	Kuwaiti Female	Kuwaiti Total	Non-Kuwaiti Male	Non-Kuwaiti Female	Non-Kuwaiti Total	Total Male	Total Female	Grand Total
1990	286,299	292,212	578,511	944,585	628,584	1,573,169	1,230,884	920,796	2,151,680
1993	325,892	331,601	657,493	682,161	305,973	988,134	1,008,053	637,574	1,645,627
1995	351,314	356,801	708,115	841,320	409,359	1,250,679	1,192,634	766,160	1,958,794
1996	363,476	368,927	732,403	914,327	447,159	1,361,486	1,277,803	816,086	2,093,889
1998	388,687	397,323	786,010	1,002,718	482,137	1,484,855	1,391,405	879,460	2,270,865
1999	401,433	410,822	812,255	970,865	471,834	1,442,699	1,372,298	882,656	2,254,954
2000	415,613	426,177	841,790	927,023	448,445	1,375,468	1,342,636	874,622	2,217,258
2001	429,209	441,074	870,283	960,390	478,429	1,438,819	1,389,599	919,503	2,309,102
2002	442,310	455,975	898,285	1,020,913	500,730	1,521,643	1,463,223	956,705	2,419,928
2003	456,226	471,460	927,686	1,098,878	520,120	1,618,998	1,555,104	991,580	2,546,684
2004	469,327	486,907	956,234	1,240,267	557,155	1,797,422	1,709,594	1,044,062	2,753,656
2005	486,089	506,128	992,217	1,391,322	607,650	1,998,972	1,877,411	1,113,778	2,991,189
2006	501,148	522,168	1,023,316	1,510,818	648,826	2,159,644	2,011,966	1,170,994	3,182,960
2007	516,631	537,966	1,054,597	1,615,273	729,767	2,345,040	2,131,904	1,267,733	3,399,637
2008	532,566	554,985	1,087,551	1,618,766	735,496	2,354,262	2,151,332	1,290,481	3,441,813
2009	548,290	570,620	1,118,910	1,591,935	774,036	2,365,971	2,140,225	1,344,656	3,484,881
2010	563,631	584,712	1,148,343	1,586,716	846,995	2,433,711	2,150,347	1,431,707	3,582,054
2011	580,558	602,616	1,183,174	1,641,135	872,983	2,514,118	2,221,693	1,475,599	3,697,292
2012	595,365	617,071	1,212,436	1,705,468	905,824	2,611,292	2,300,833	1,522,895	3,823,728
2013	610,545	631,954	1,242,499	1,772,413	950,232	2,722,645	2,382,958	1,582,186	3,965,144
2014	626,256	649,601	1,275,857	1,855,279	960,857	2,816,136	2,481,535	1,610,458	4,091,993
2015	641,282	666,323	1,307,605	1,964,264	967,137	2,931,401	2,605,546	1,633,460	4,239,006
2016	656,084	681,609	1,337,693	2,089,302	984,129	3,073,431	2,745,386	1,665,738	4,411,124
2017	671,012	699,001	1,370,013	2,167,409	963,054	3,130,463	2,838,421	1,662,055	4,500,476
2018	686,475	716,638	1,403,113	2,253,768	964,757	3,218,525	2,940,243	1,681,395	4,621,638
2019	700,742	731,303	1,432,045	2,303,549	1,040,813	3,344,362	3,004,291	1,772,116	4,776,407
2020	714,936	745,034	1,459,970	2,177,731	1,033,012	3,210,743	2,892,667	1,778,046	4,670,713
2021	729,638	759,078	1,488,716	1,941,628	955,373	2,897,001	2,671,266	1,714,451	4,385,717
2022	744,238	772,838	1,517,076	2,188,819	1,087,673	3,276,492	2,933,057	1,860,511	4,793,568
2023	758,716	787,065	1,545,781	2,262,500	1,104,990	3,367,490	3,021,216	1,892,055	4,913,271

The biggest population difficulty in Kuwait involves the Bedoon, stateless people. According to Human Rights Watch in 1995, Kuwait has produced 300,000 stateless Bedoon. Kuwait has the largest number of stateless people in the entire region. The statelessness challenge for the Bedoon in Kuwait is largely sectarian.

According to recent statistics provided by the Central Statistics Bureau, as of January 2024, Kuwait's population reached 4.91 million, an increase of 119,700 from the previous year's 4.79 million. The number of Kuwaiti citizens rose by 28,700 to reach a total of 1.545 million. Specifically, the number of male citizens increased to 758,700, and female citizens reached 787,000. Concurrently, the expatriate population also increased by 90,990, totaling 3.36 million. Amongst the expatriates, the male population reached 2.26 million and the female population 1.1 million.

=== Structure of the population ===
Structure of the population (Estimates) (1.01.2020):

Age group	Male	Female	Total	%
Total	2,743,617	1,720,904	4,464,521	100%
0–4	123,865	111,800	235,663	5.27%
5–9	190,736	153,412	344,148	7.7%
10–14	160,820	129,882	290,702	6.51%
15–19	135,324	111,798	247,122	5.53%
20–24	126,687	102,773	229,460	5.13%
25–29	113,416	93,183	206,599	4.62%
30–34	205,555	157,101	362,656	8.12%
35–39	341,766	192,989	534,755	11.97%
40–44	368,779	180,249	549,028	12.29%
45–49	342,307	165,443	507,750	11.37%
50–54	234,060	112,764	346,824	7.76%
55–59	158,989	76,976	235,965	5.28%
60–64	105,746	46,617	152,363	3.41%
65–69	59,345	27,921	87,266	1.95%
70–74	26,885	15,982	42,867	0.96%
75–79	11,984	8,711	20,695	0.46%
80+	10,839	7,912	18,751	0.42%
Age group	Male	Female	Total	Percent
0–14	475,419	395,094	870,513	19.49%
15–64	2,132,629	1,239,893	3,372,522	75.54%
65+	109,053	60,526	169,579	3.80%

Age Group	Kuwaiti Males	Kuwaiti Females	Total Kuwaitis	Non-Kuwaiti Males	Non-Kuwaiti Females	Total Non-Kuwaitis	Total Males	Total Females	Grand Total
Less than 1 year	16,911	15,860	32,771	8,928	8,483	17,411	25,839	24,343	50,182
1–4	62,966	61,810	124,776	47,627	47,086	94,713	110,593	108,896	219,489
5–9	87,292	82,393	169,685	75,842	71,866	147,708	163,134	154,259	317,393
10–14	88,104	83,914	172,018	74,787	70,185	144,972	162,891	154,099	316,990
15–19	76,609	75,089	151,698	55,679	52,907	108,586	132,288	127,996	260,284
20–24	66,815	65,104	131,919	62,238	44,489	106,727	129,053	109,593	238,646
25–29	66,647	64,461	131,108	239,562	86,968	326,530	306,209	151,429	457,638
30–34	48,975	52,607	101,582	288,214	125,939	414,153	337,189	178,546	515,735
35–39	52,231	56,948	109,179	363,465	164,133	527,598	415,696	221,081	636,777
40–44	42,233	45,508	87,741	334,328	140,911	475,239	376,561	186,419	562,980
45–49	34,203	39,923	74,126	245,893	111,643	357,536	280,096	151,566	431,662
50–54	29,381	34,453	63,834	181,928	75,451	257,379	211,309	109,904	321,213
55–59	24,419	29,126	53,545	114,223	43,782	158,005	138,642	72,908	211,550
60–64	17,572	22,913	40,485	54,780	22,135	76,915	72,352	45,048	117,400
65–69	12,779	17,485	30,264	24,294	10,517	34,811	37,073	28,002	65,075
70–74	7,492	11,399	18,891	9,966	5,345	15,311	17,458	16,744	34,202
75–79	4,791	7,473	12,264	4,196	3,095	7,291	8,987	10,568	19,555
80+	4,818	6,372	11,190	2,869	2,738	5,607	7,687	9,110	16,797
Total	744,238	772,838	1,517,076	2,188,819	1,087,673	3,276,492	2,933,057	1,860,511	4,793,568

=== Governorates ===
Kuwait consists of six governorates: Hawalli, Asimah, Farwaniyah, Jahra, Ahmadi and Mubarak Al-Kabeer. Most people in Kuwait live in the governorates of Hawalli, Asimah, and Farwaniyah.

Nationality Group		GCC countries	Arab countries	Asia	SS Africa	Europe	North America	South America	Oceania	Total
Capital Governorate	Male	144,354	45,550	118,393	991	953	1,000	115	105	311,461
Capital Governorate	Female	150,029	22,018	84,561	4,759	971	887	88	65	263,378
Capital Governorate	Total	294,383	67,568	202,954	5,750	1,924	1,887	203	170	574,839
Hawalli Governorate	Male	124,551	224,700	162,749	1,477	3,890	4,549	369	353	522,638
Hawalli Governorate	Female	127,709	127,931	133,244	5,883	4,098	3,979	372	316	403,532
Hawalli Governorate	Total	252,260	352,631	295,993	7,360	7,988	8,528	741	669	926,170
Al-Ahmadi Governorate	Male	176,599	98,007	312,505	3,214	1,717	3,239	312	139	595,732
Al-Ahmadi Governorate	Female	179,803	40,929	99,448	5,282	983	1,376	145	86	328,052
Al-Ahmadi Governorate	Total	356,402	138,936	411,953	8,496	2,700	4,615	457	225	923,784
Al-Jahra Governorate	Male	138,772	85,450	94,286	1,630	262	260	115	59	320,834
Al-Jahra Governorate	Female	141,876	57,551	40,935	5,068	268	198	81	50	246,027
Al-Jahra Governorate	Total	280,648	143,001	135,221	6,698	530	458	196	109	566,861
Al-Farwaniya Governorate	Male	130,514	273,035	369,097	2,551	463	493	91	59	776,303
Al-Farwaniya Governorate	Female	135,497	74,258	117,987	4,927	383	352	79	33	333,516
Al-Farwaniya Governorate	Total	266,011	347,293	487,084	7,478	846	845	170	92	1,109,819
Mubarak Al-Kabeer Governorate	Male	89,764	7,764	42,714	339	359	650	87	31	141,708
Mubarak Al-Kabeer Governorate	Female	92,949	5,429	35,767	2,856	417	452	66	22	137,958
Mubarak Al-Kabeer Governorate	Total	182,713	13,193	78,481	3,195	776	1,102	153	53	279,666
Not Stated	Male	1,618	581	338	21	10	15	5	2	2,590
Not Stated	Female	1,165	568	208	17	6	19	3	2	1,988
Not Stated	Total	2,783	1,149	546	38	16	34	8	4	4,578
Total	Male	806,172	735,087	1,100,082	10,223	7,654	10,206	1,094	748	2,671,266
Total	Female	829,028	328,684	512,150	28,792	7,126	7,263	834	574	1,714,451
Total	Total	1,635,200	1,063,771	1,612,232	39,015	14,780	17,469	1,928	1,332	4,385,717

== Vital statistics ==
UN estimates

Period	Live births per year	Deaths per year	Natural change per year	CBR*	CDR*	NC*	TFR*	IMR*
1950–1955	8,000	2,000	6,000	43.7	12.3	31.4	7.21	113
1955–1960	9,000	2,000	7,000	40.0	9.6	30.4	7.21	90
1960–1965	16,000	3,000	13,000	43.4	7.6	35.8	7.31	70
1965–1970	30,000	4,000	26,000	48.8	6.3	42.5	7.41	53
1970–1975	43,000	5,000	38,000	47.6	5.2	42.4	6.90	40
1975–1980	49,000	5,000	44,000	40.7	4.2	36.5	5.89	29
1980–1985	58,000	5,000	52,000	37.1	3.4	33.6	5.10	22
1985–1990	51,000	5,000	45,000	26.5	2.8	23.7	3.34	16
1990–1995	33,000	5,000	28,000	18.0	2.7	15.3	2.20	13
1995–2000	43,000	5,000	38,000	24.1	3.0	21.1	2.93	11
2000–2005	39,000	6,000	32,000	18.5	3.1	15.4	2.24	10
2005–2010	47,000	7,000	40,000	18.7	3.1	15.6	2.32	8
2010–2015	58,000	9,000	49,000	16.1	2.4	13.7	2.08	8
2015–2020	60,000	12,000	48,000	12.6	2.9	9.7	2.07	7
* CBR = crude birth rate (per 1000); CDR = crude death rate (per 1000); NC = natural change (per 1000); IMR = infant mortality rate per 1000 births; TFR = total fertility rate (number of children per woman)

=== Registered births and deaths ===
	Average population	Live births	Deaths	Natural change	Crude birth rate (per 1000)	Crude death rate (per 1000)	Natural change (per 1000)	Crude migration rate (per 1000)	TFR
1958		6,881							
1959		9,023							
1960		11,616	1,235	10,381					
1961	296,000	12,942	2,504	10,438	43.7	8.4	35.2		
1962	337,000	15,204	2,180	13,024	45.1	6.5	38.6	7.67	
1963	384,000	17,397	2,139	15,258	45.4	5.6	39.8	5.82	
1964	433,000	19,428	2,618	16,810	44.8	6.0	38.8	3.58	
1965	484,000	21,950	2,454	19,496	45.3	5.1	40.3	5.55	
1966	536,000	23,732	2,813	20,919	44.3	5.3	39.0	2.65	
1967	588,000	28,334	3,111	25,223	48.2	5.3	42.9	7.32	
1968	642,000	33,026	3,346	29,680	51.5	5.2	46.3	6.94	
1969	697,000	35,135	3,378	31,757	50.4	4.8	45.6	2.98	
1970	753,000	33,842	3,735	30,107	44.9	5.0	40.0	-2.19	
1971	811,000	35,558	3,832	31,726	43.8	4.7	39.1	2.00	
1972	870,000	37,688	4,149	33,539	43.3	4.8	38.5	2.08	
1973	931,000	40,165	4,601	35,564	43.2	4.9	38.2	2.17	
1974	992,000	41,060	4,693	36,367	41.4	4.7	36.7	0.81	
1975	1,054,000	42,861	4,778	38,083	40.7	4.5	36.1	1.63	
1976	1,116,000	46,039	4,661	41,378	41.3	4.2	37.1	2.95	
1977	1,179,000	46,864	5,365	41,499	39.8	4.6	35.2	0.10	
1978	1,243,000	48,010	4,936	43,074	38.6	4.0	34.7	1.27	
1979	1,309,000	48,273	5,028	43,245	36.9	3.8	33.0	0.13	
1980	1,377,000	51,090	4,932	46,158	37.1	3.6	33.5	2.12	
1981	1,446,000	52,041	4,678	47,363	36.0	3.2	32.8	0.83	
1982	1,514,000	54,257	4,992	49,265	35.8	3.3	32.5	1.26	
1983	1,584,000	55,617	4,654	50,963	35.1	2.9	32.2	1.07	
1984	1,660,000	56,776	4,544	52,232	34.2	2.7	31.5	0.76	
1985	1,742,000	55,087	4,711	50,376	31.6	2.7	28.9	−1.07	
1986	1,836,000	53,845	4,390	49,455	29.3	2.4	26.9	−0.50	
1987	1,937,000	52,412	4,113	48,299	27.1	2.1	24.9	−0.60	
1988	2,028,000	53,080	4,581	48,499	26.2	2.3	23.9	0.10	
1989	2,084,000	52,858	4,628	48,230	25.4	2.2	23.1	−0.13	
1990	2,088,000								
1991	2,031,000	20,609	3,380	17,229	10.1	1.7	8.5		
1992	1,924,000	34,817	3,369	31,448	18.1	1.8	16.3	7.39	
1993	1,796,000	37,379	3,441	33,938	20.8	1.9	18.9	1.39	
1994	1,688,000	38,868	3,464	35,404	23.0	2.1	21.0	0.87	
1995	1,628,000	41,169	3,781	37,388	25.3	2.3	23.0	1.22	
1996	1,628,000	44,620	3,812	40,808	27.4	2.3	25.1	2.10	
1997	1,679,000	42,815	4,017	38,798	25.5	2.4	23.1	−1.20	
1998	1,764,000	41,424	4,216	37,208	23.5	2.4	21.1	−0.90	
1999	1,857,000	41,135	4,187	36,948	22.1	2.3	19.9	−0.14	
2000	1,941,000	41,843	4,227	37,616	21.6	2.2	19.4	0.34	
2001	2,010,000	41,342	4,364	36,978	20.6	2.2	18.4	−0.32	
2002	2,070,000	43,490	4,342	39,148	21.0	2.1	18.9	1.05	
2003	2,127,000	43,982	4,424	39,558	20.7	2.1	18.6	0.19	
2004	2,189,000	47,274	4,793	42,481	21.6	2.2	19.4	1.34	
2005	2,264,000	50,941	4,784	46,157	22.5	2.1	20.4	1.62	
2006	2,351,000	52,759	5,247	47,512	22.4	2.2	20.2	0.58	
2007	2,448,000	53,587	5,293	48,294	21.9	2.2	19.7	0.32	
2008	2,548,000	54,571	5,701	48,870	21.4	2.2	19.2	0.24	
2009	2,778,000	56,503	6,266	50,237	20.3	2.3	18.1	0.49	
2010	2,933,000	57,533	5,448	52,085	19.6	1.9	17.8	0.63	
2011	3,099,000	58,198	5,339	52,859	18.7	1.7	17.0	0.25	1.95
2012	3,246,622	59,753	5,950	53,803	18.4	1.8	16.6	0.29	1.86
2013	3,427,595	59,426	5,909	53,517	17.3	1.7	15.6	−0.08	1.719
2014	3,588,092	61,313	6,031	55,282	16.3	1.6	14.7	0.49	1.915
2015	3,743,660	59,271	6,481	52,790	14.9	1.6	13.3	−0.67	
2016	3,925,487	58,797	6,338	52,459	14.4	1.5	12.9	−0.08	2.062
2017	4,082,704	59,172	6,679	52,493	14.7	1.7	13.0	0.01	2.152
2018	4,226,920	56,121	6,807	49,314	13.6	1.7	11.9	−0.75	2.161
2019	4,420,110	53,565	7,306	46,259	12.1	1.6	10.4	−0.69	2.082
2020	4,464,521	52,463	10,569	41,894	11.7	2.4	9.3	−0.98	2.033
2021	4,336,012	51,585	10,938	40,647	11.9	2.5	9.4	−0.29	2.148
2022	4,385,717	49,793	8,041	41,752	10.9	1.8	9.1	0.25	1.546
2023	4,793,568	50,034	7,436	42,568	10.3	1.5	8.8	0.19	1.524
2024	4,913,271	49,063	7,422	41,641	10.0	1.5	8.5	−0.22	1.560
2025	5,026,078	50,642	7,590	43,052	10.4	1.6	8.8		

View source data.
View source data.

=== Fertility ===
Years	1925	1926	1927	1928	1929	1930	1931	1932	1933	1934
Total Fertility Rate in Kuwait	6.87	6.88	6.90	6.91	6.93	6.94	6.95	6.97	6.98	7.00

Years	1935	1936	1937	1938	1939	1940	1941	1942	1943	1944
Total Fertility Rate in Kuwait	7.01	7.03	7.04	7.05	7.07	7.08	7.10	7.11	7.13	7.14

Years	1945	1946	1947	1948	1949
Total Fertility Rate in Kuwait	7.16	7.17	7.18	7.20	7.21

=== Life expectancy ===
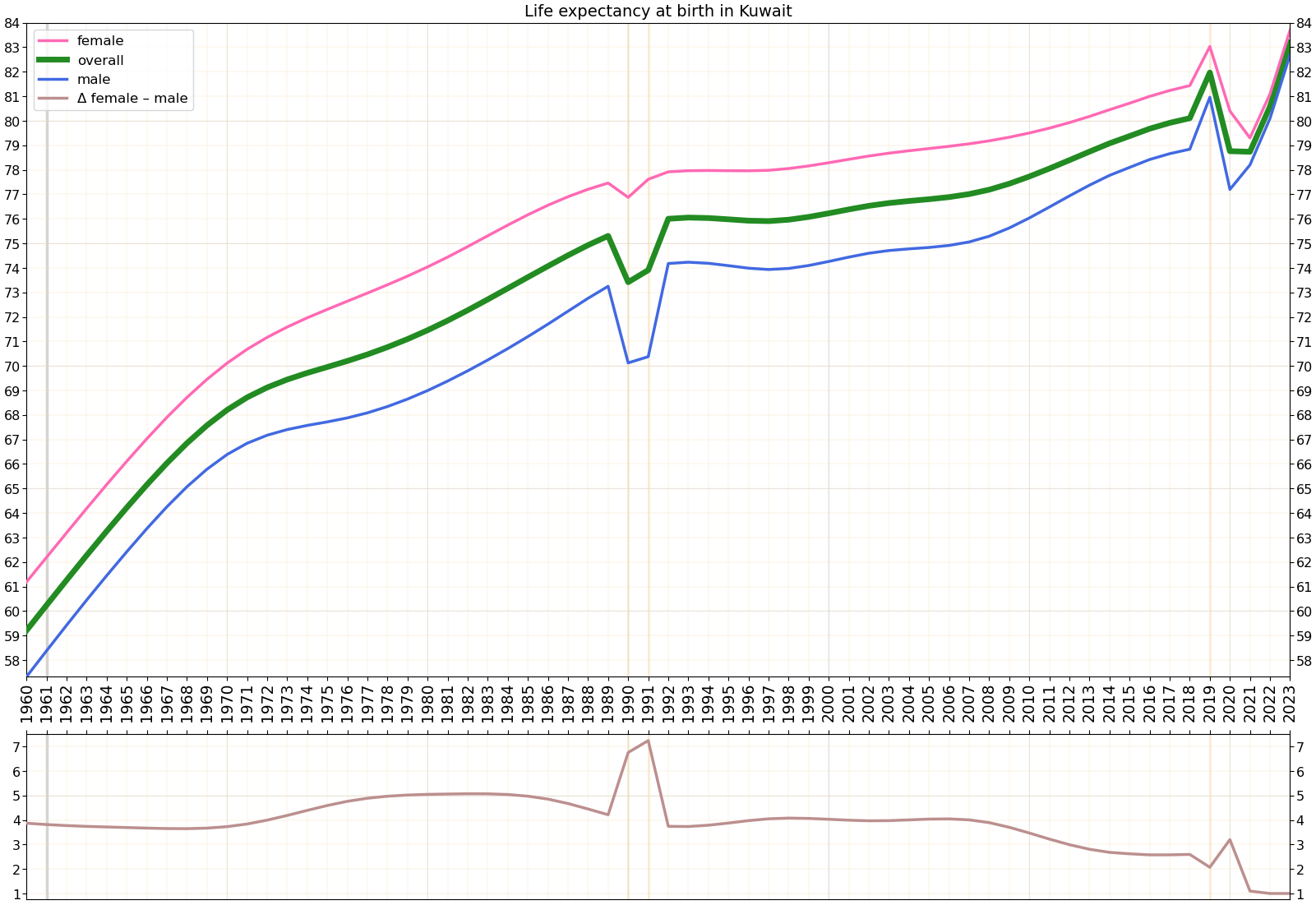
Life expectancy at birth in Kuwait

Period	Life expectancy in Years	Period	Life expectancy in Years
1950–1955	53.6	1985–1990	71.6
1955–1960	58.3	1990–1995	72.4
1960–1965	62.0	1995–2000	73.0
1965–1970	64.9	2000–2005	73.3
1970–1975	67.1	2005–2010	73.7
1975–1980	68.7	2010–2015	74.3
1980–1985	70.3	2015–2020	75.1

Source: UN World Population Prospects

== Ethnic groups ==
=== By continent ===
Nationality Group	Population
GCC countries	1,635,200
Arab countries	1,063,771
Asia	1,612,232
Sub-Saharan Africa	39,015
Europe	14,780
North America	17,469
South America	1,928
Oceania	1,322
Total	4,385,717

=== By nationality ===
The following is a firm containing estimations from countries' embassies:

Nationality	Population	% of Total Population	Year of Data
Kuwait	1,294,513	30.90%	2015
India	1,152,000	24.04%	2020
Egypt	666,000	15.70%	2020
Bangladesh	350,000	8.40%	2021
Pakistan	339,000	8.30%	2021
Philippines	241,000	5.68%	2020
Syria	161,000	3.80%	2015
Lebanon	106,000	2.50%	?
Palestine	100,000	2.38%	2020
Nepal	101,193	2.24%	2019
Sri Lanka	96,000	2.26%	2016
Stateless	93,000	2.20%	2015
Ethiopia	74,000	1.80%	2012
Iran	50,000	1.20%	2015
Jordan	33,000	0.83%	2022
USA	30,000	0.70%	2013
Indonesia	28,954	0.68%	2020
Iraq	16,000–18,000	~0.4%	2015
Afghanistan	15,000	0.36%	2015
Yemen	11,000	0.26%	2012
Sudan	7,000	0.17%	2015
Canada	7,000	0.17%	2020
Bahrain	6,856	0.16%	2021
Armenia	5,000	0.12%	2015
China	5,000	0.12%	2014
North Korea	4,000	0.10%	2013
Turkey	4,000	0.10%	2009
UK	4,000	0.10%	2022
Oman	3,634	0.09%	2021
Qatar	1,731	0.04%	2021
UAE	1,730	0.04%	2021
Eritrea	1,500	0.04%	2015
South Korea	1,500	0.04%	2015
South Africa	1,000	0.02%	2013
Romania	800	0.02%	2014
Australia	800	0.02%	2024
Germany	500–600	~0.01%	2015
Nigeria	500	0.01%	?
Spain	500	0.01%	2015
Kenya	400	<0.01%	2015
Venezuela	400	<0.01%	2015
Vietnam	400	<0.01%	2015
Brazil	300	<0.01%	2015
Hungary	300	<0.01%	2014
Malaysia	300	<0.01%	2015
Poland	300	<0.01%	2015
Ukraine	300	<0.01%	2015
Greece	250	<0.01%	2015
Myanmar	200	<0.01%	2015
Denmark	200	<0.01%	2021
Senegal	170	<0.01%	2015
Mexico	120–150	<0.01%	2015
Slovakia	100–150	<0.01%	2015
Switzerland	105	<0.01%	2015
Argentina	100	<0.01%	2015
Czech Republic	50	<0.01%	2015
Slovenia	<50	<0.01%	2015
Cambodia	47	<0.01%	2015
Taiwan	30–50	<0.01%	2015
Nicaragua	40	<0.01%	2015
Cyprus	37	<0.01%	2015
Mongolia	20	<0.01%	2015
Kyrgyzstan	14	<0.01%	2015
Peru	10	<0.01%	2015
Lesotho	7	<0.01%	2015
Guyana	2	<0.01%	2015

Kuwaiti 41.4%, Arab expat 21.4%, Asian (mostly South Asian) 35.3%, African 1%, other 0.7% (includes European, North American, South American, and Australian) (2018 est.)

== Languages ==
- Arabic (official)
- English (lingua franca, spoken widely)
- Minority languages include,
  - Tagalog
  - Gulf Pidgin Arabic (lingua franca)
  - Hindi
  - Persian
  - Bengali
  - Urdu
  - French
  - Malayalam
  - Pashto
  - Turkish
  - Armenian
  - Kurdish

== Religion ==
Religion in Kuwait (ARDA 2020 est.)
1. Sunni (67.1%)
2. Other Muslim (11.0%)
3. Catholic (8.92%)
4. Orthodox (5.16%)
5. Other Christian (0.54%)
6. Hinduism (5.00%)
7. Baháʼí (0.54%)
8. Sikhism (0.40%)
9. None (1.38%)
- Muslim (official) 74.6%
- Christian 18.2%
- Other and Unspecified 7.2%

== See also ==
- Religion in Kuwait
- Expatriates in Kuwait
