= Geology of Kuwait =

The geology of Kuwait includes extremely thick, oil and gas-bearing sedimentary sequences from the Mesozoic and Cenozoic. Kuwait is a country in Western Asia, situated in the northern edge of Eastern Arabia at the tip of the Persian Gulf.

== Geologic history, stratigraphy and tectonics ==
The oldest crystalline basement rocks beneath Kuwait are poorly understood due to the thickness of overlying sedimentary rocks. In the early 1960s, a 13,853 foot deep well in the Burgan oil field only reached rocks dating to the Triassic including clay, marl, limestone, shale and anhydrite. This is overlain by 4500 feet of Jurassic rocks, primarily limestone but with 1300 feet of anhydrite, likely related to the Hith Anhydrite. Cretaceous rocks are up to 6000 feet thick in the southeast or 10,000 feet in the northwest, predominantly limestone, shale and sandstone belonging to the Zubair Formation and Burgan Formation.

Cenozoic rocks nearer the surface are well researched. Rocks 3500 to 2500 feet thick date to Paleocene and Eocene, with primarily limestone and Rus Formation evaporite. The Kuwait Group outcrops in the southeast with clay sandstone. Wara and Burgan have hills capped with weathered sandstone and chert. In fact, chert limestone is up to two feet thick at Gurain hill. Together, these rocks formed during the Pliocene, Miocene and Pleistocene.

The Ghar Formation is identifiable in the Jal-Az-Zor escarpment with coarse-grained or pebbly sandstone and green clay beds from the Oligocene and Miocene.

The country has extensive Quaternary deposits such as beach sands welded together with calcium carbonate, deltaic and tidal mudflats at Bubiyan Island and in the northeast as well as windblown sand. The Dibdibba Formation from the Miocene to the Pleistocene overlies the fossil bearing Lower Fars Formation with gypsum bearing sandy clay beds and coarse igneous and metamorphic gravels.
