= Kuwait Flour Mills & Bakeries Company =

State-owned company

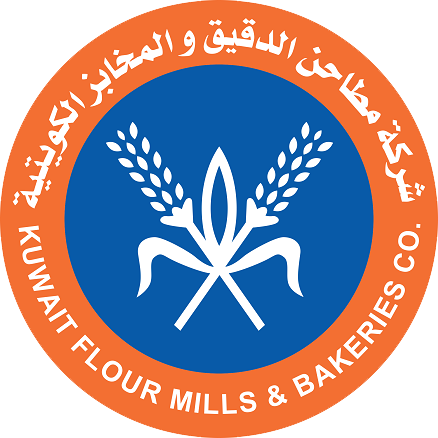
- Company type: State owned Company
- Industry: Food Manufacturing
- Founded: 1961
- Headquarters: Shuwaikh, Kuwait
- Key people: Mutlaq Y. Al-Zayed (CEO).
- Number of employees: 4,000
- Website: www.kuwaitflourmills.com

Kuwait Flour Mills & Bakeries Company (KFMB) is a state owned group headquartered in Industrial Shuwaikh, Kuwait. KFMB specializes in production and supplying of products like biscuits, flour, bread, buns, and vegetable oils in Kuwait. The Company also produces various forms of pasta and animal feed. KFMB shoulders a sizeable role in Kuwait’s economy by generating $1.3 billion in annual sales revenues and a net profit of $123 million in 2016.

KFMB has eight Arabic bakeries, accompanied by Sabhan Bakery that focuses on European bread production. It provides automated material handling and storage services through its principal holdings (KFMB has a total storage capacity of 375,000 tons at the port) and is in charge of providing flour and other grains to the country. KFMB factories are considered as one of the largest (3,000 tons of daily milling capacity), state-of-the-art, and acculturated in the Persian Gulf and Middle East areas. KFMB employs almost 4,000 employees.

== History ==
Soon after the state's independence, the Kuwaiti government quickly commenced its program of industrialization, creating a number of new companies under its control. One of these was the Kuwait Flour Mills Company. Incorporated in 1961, the company focused on specialized food products and familiarized them to the market. In 1969, the company launched a factory for the production of macaroni and in 1970 a factory for the production of biscuits. KFMB commissioned a vegetable oil factory in 1976, a first of its nature in the Persian Gulf region. Beginning in 1978, the company took steps to build additional bakeries, all geographically situated in Kuwait, which was considered an industrial milestone in the Persian Gulf area at that point in time.

In 1988, ‘Kuwait Flour Mills Company’ was merged with ‘Kuwait Bakeries Company’ and attained its new identity as “Kuwait Flour Mills & Bakeries Company”. In 1994, KFMB took over the government-run ‘Kuwait Supply Company’, which provided and delivered food supply and construction materials. These products were subsidized by the government in accordance with the policies and resolutions of the Ministry of Commerce and Industry. The company currently offers a full range of flours, including specialized flours used in the production of Arabic bread types, as well as processed flours used in European bread.

In compliance with the company’s mission to achieve food security, the company established the Animal Feed Plant in 1996 for the production of animal feed enriched with nutritional values to serve the livestock that is one of the integral elements for nutrition in the country.

== Awards ==
In the Gulfood Innovation Awards, held at Gulfood, Dubai (DWTC), from 26-30 January 2026, Kuwait Flour Mills and Bakeries Company won two certifications, ‘Certificate of Best Stand Design’ - “Recognition of Outstanding Stand Design” and ‘Certificate of Appreciation’ - “Recognition of innovation, quality and Nutritional advancement demonstrated through its Protein-focused Product Range”

In the Gulfood Innovation Award, held at Gulfood, Dubai, from 26 February to 2 March 2017, Kuwait Flour Mills and Bakeries Company won the ‘Best Health and Wellness Product Award’ for Gluten Free Products and Biscuit (Totally bran).

== Subsidiaries and branches ==
- Shuwaikh - Jamal Abdul Nasser Street - Head Office
- Shuwaikh Industrial Area
- Rumaithiya
- Yarmouk
- Keifan
- Khaitan
- Shaab
- Fahad Al Ahmad
- Sabhan
- Jahra
- Ahmadi
- Saad Al Abdullah

== Bakery Store ==
The bakery store is designed in a modern style to allow customers to experience shopping of all Kuwait Flour Mills and Bakeries company products. A section for freshly baked products. The stores are open 24/7 daily.

- Yarmouk - opened on 6 January 2022
- Fahad Al Ahmad - opened on 2 January 2023
- Saad Al Abdullah City - opened on 14 December 2023
