= Religion in Kuwait =

Religion in Kuwait (total residents, 31 December 2020)
1. Islam (74.6%)
2. Christianity (18.2%)
3. Other (7.20%)

Islam is the official religion in Kuwait, and the majority of the citizen population is Muslim.

There are also small native Christian and Baháʼí populations. Most expatriates in Kuwait are Muslim, Hindu, Christian or Buddhist.

== Islam ==
Aerial view of a man reading the Quran at Mulla Sayyid Abdul Wahhab Alhunayyan Mosque in Kuwait.

Kuwait's official state religion is Maliki Sunni Islam. Most Muslim Kuwaiti citizens are Sunni. Shia Muslims are a significant minority in Kuwait; several other Muslim sects do exist in Kuwaiti society but in very small numbers. The Al Sabah ruling family (including the Emir) adhere to the Maliki school of Sunni Islam.

Over one million non-citizen Muslims resided in Kuwait in 2019.

=== Population estimates ===
Religion in Kuwait by ethnicity ( January 1, 2023)
Muslim	Kuwaiti	99.97%
Muslim	non-Kuwaiti	63.02%
Christianity	Kuwaiti	0.01%
Christianity	non-Kuwaiti	26.08%
Hinduism and Other	Kuwaiti	0%
Hinduism and Other	non-Kuwaiti	10.88%

There is no official national census disclosing sectarian affiliation. The population estimates have varied over time. In 2001, there were an estimated 525,000 Sunni Kuwaiti citizens and 300,000 Shia Kuwaiti citizens. In 2002, the US Department of State estimated that there were 525,000 Sunni Kuwaiti citizens and 855,000 Kuwaiti citizens in total (61% Sunnis, 39% Shias). In 2004, there were an estimated 600,000 Sunni Kuwaiti citizens, 300,000-350,000 Shia Kuwaiti citizens and 913,000 Kuwaiti citizens in total. In 2007, it was estimated that around 70% of citizens belonged to the Sunni branch of Islam while the remaining 30% were Shias. In 2008, the Strategic Studies Institute estimated that Sunnis constituted 60% of the population. In 2022, it was estimated that around 70% of Muslims living in Kuwait belonged to the Sunni branch of Islam while the remaining 30% were Shias. Other population estimates gave an 80:20 ratio.

== Other Abrahamic religions ==
=== Christianity ===
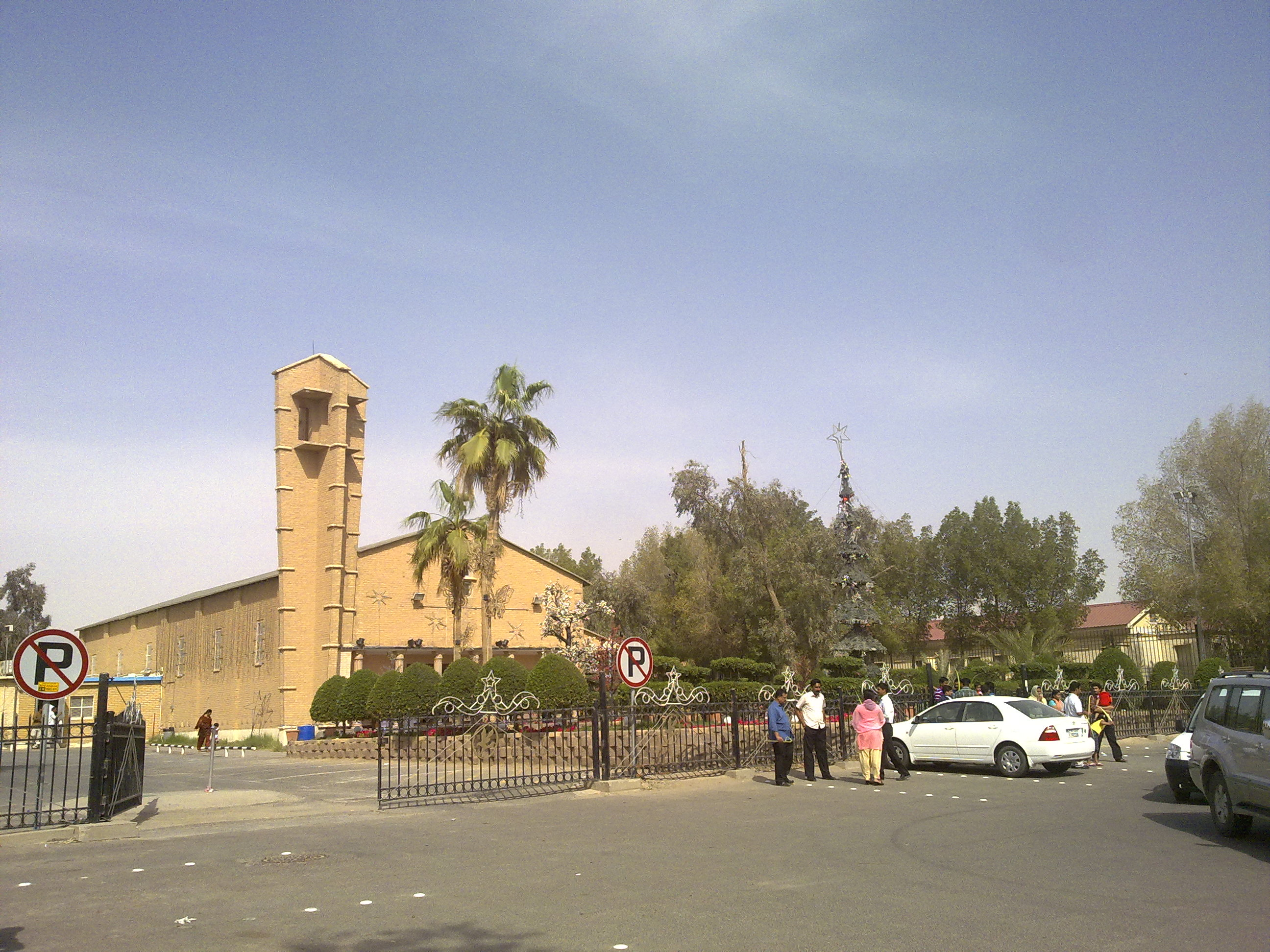
Our Lady of Arabia Parish in Al Ahmadi.

Christianity is a minority religion in Kuwait. In 2020, there were an estimated 289 Christian Kuwaitis residing in Kuwait. Kuwait is the only GCC country besides Bahrain to have a local Christian population who hold citizenship. Of the non-citizen population, there are an estimated 837,585 Christians (31 December 2020), or 17.93% of the population.

The government-recognized Christian churches include the Catholic Church, the Coptic Orthodox Church, the National Evangelical Church Kuwait (Protestant), the Armenian Apostolic Church, the Greek Orthodox Church, the Greek Catholic (Melkite) Church, the Anglican Church, and the Church of Jesus Christ of Latter-day Saints. There are also many Christian religious groups not officially recognised by the government with smaller populations, including the Indian Orthodox, Mar Thoma, and Seventh-day Adventist Church. Unrecognized groups are generally free to worship in private. There are also a number of believers in Christ from a Muslim background in the country, though many are not citizens. A 2015 study estimated that around 350 people in the country follow these beliefs.

=== Baháʼí ===
The official 2013 census only shows three religion categories: "Muslim", "Christian" and "Other", with only 18 people in the other category. There are a small number of Kuwaiti citizens who follow the Baháʼí Faith, with other sources stating that there were approximately 400 Baháʼís in total in Kuwait in 2022.

=== Judaism ===
There were several Kuwaiti Jewish families before the 1950s, however all local Jewish families left Kuwait by the 1980s.

== Indian religions ==
=== Hinduism ===
There are estimated 300,000 non-citizen Hindus in Kuwait.

=== Buddhism ===
Approximately 100,000 non-citizen Buddhists reside in Kuwait.

=== Sikhism ===
There are an estimated 10,000 non-citizen Sikhs in Kuwait.

== Religion by Nationality (2020) ==
Religion by Nationality in Kuwait (2020)
Nationality	Islam		Christian		Other		Total	
Nationality	#	%	#	%	#	%	#	%
Kuwaiti	1,459,656	99.97%	290	0.01%	25	0.00%	1,459,970	31.25%
Arabian	1,188,738	93.97%	69,574	5.48%	9,108	0.71%	1,267,420	27.13%
Asian	798,297	42.98%	728,000	39.19%	330,928	17.81%	1,857,224	39.76%
African	16,250	35.05%	22,874	49.34%	7,227	15.59%	46,350	0.99%
European	6,640	39.66%	9,043	54.04%	1,050	6.29%	16,733	0.35%
American & Australian	13,722	59.62%	8,095	35.17%	1,198	5.20%	23,015	0.49%
Kuwait	3,483,300	74.57%	837,874	17.93%	349,539	7.48%	4,670,713	100%

== Conflicts ==
Sectarian affiliation has been a source of civil conflict in Kuwait. The Kuwaiti Constitution guarantees freedom of belief and the right to practice any religion so long as it does not interfere with customs. Law No. 19 of 2012 criminalizes the instigation of violence based on the supremacy of one sectarian faction, promoting the supremacy of any faction, or promoting hatred or contempt of any party.

In April 2022, a Kuwaiti citizen was convicted of blasphemy and sentenced to two months in prison and a fine of KD10,000 ($33,000) after posting blasphemous comments on social media.

In 2023, Kuwait was scored 2 out of 4 for religious freedom; blasphemy is a punishable offence and non-Muslims are forbidden from proselytizing, although they can worship privately.

== See also ==
- Catholic Church in Kuwait
- Freedom of religion in Kuwait
- Demographics of Kuwait
