= Expatriates in Kuwait =

Total population
- 3.74 million (2026); 70% of Kuwait population

Regions with significant populations
- Kuwait City and suburbs

Languages
- English (lingua franca) • Arabic • Hindi • Malayalam • Urdu • Pashto • Tagalog • Persian • Others

Religion
- Islam • Christianity • Hinduism • Others

Related ethnic groups
- Expatriates in the United Arab Emirates

There are a large number of expatriates in Kuwait, with most residing in the capital of Kuwait City. Expatriates are primarily attracted by the employment opportunities. Foreign nationals account for approximately 70% of Kuwait's total population.

== West Asian populations ==
=== Armenians ===
Before the Gulf War, the Armenian population reached its peak of 12,000. But after the Iraqi invasions, the numbers of the Armenians in Kuwait greatly diminished to just 500 as they left the country and did not return.

A firm stated that as of 2015, about 5,000 Armenians are living in Kuwait.

=== Bahrainis ===
About 6,856 Bahraini citizens are living in Kuwait.

=== Emiratis ===
About 1,730 Emiratis are living in Kuwait.

=== Iraqis ===
About 16,800 - 18,000 Iraqis are living in Kuwait.

=== Jordanians ===
About 33,000 Jordanians are living in Kuwait.

=== Lebanese ===
106,000 Lebanese Nationals live in Kuwait, mainly Kuwait City.

=== Omanis ===
About 3,634 Omanis are living in Kuwait.

=== Palestinians ===
There are around 70,000 Palestinian expats in Kuwait. However, a firm stated that as of 2015, about 10,000 Palestine nationals live in Kuwait.

=== Qataris ===
About 1,731 Qataris are living in Kuwait.

=== Saudis ===
540,773 Saudi Arabian nationals live in Kuwait., However, a firm stated that about 132,533 Saudis are living in Kuwait. Both Kuwait and Saudi Arabia are neighbours and part of the Gulf Cooperation Council, which means that the citizens of each GCC member can live and work in any of the six countries without a visa.

=== Syrians ===
There are around 161,000 Syrian expats in Kuwait. Syrians were among the first educated work force in Kuwait, the first Syrian expats immigrated to Kuwait in the 1960s.

=== Yemenis ===
About 11,000 Yemenis are living in Kuwait.

=== Iranians ===
In 2012, there were 45,000 Iranian expats according to the population census. Iranians are heavily concentrated in the Bneid al-Gar suburb of Kuwait City. Most Iranians are employed in the private sector. In 2011, there were 42,795 Iranians in Kuwait; 699 were employed in the public sector, 24,684 in the private sector and 16,577 were on dependent visas.

There are Iranian schools in Kuwait, all privately funded and located in the suburbs of Kuwait City, for example the Iranian School of Kuwait.

=== Turks ===
There are 4,000 Turkish expats in Kuwait. Most Turks work as barbers, engineers, businessmen and doctors.

== North African populations ==
=== Egyptians ===
Egyptians are the second largest expat community in Kuwait, numbering more than 667,000 workers (September 2026).

=== Sudanese ===
About 7,000 Sudanese are living in Kuwait.

== Sub-Saharan African populations ==
=== Ethiopians ===
About 74,000 Ethiopians are living in Kuwait.

=== Eritreans ===
About 1,500 Eritreans are living in Kuwait.

=== Kenyans ===
About 400 Kenyans are living in Kuwait.

=== Lesothoans ===
About 7 Basotho are living in Kuwait.

=== Nigerians ===
About 500 Nigerians are living in Kuwait.

=== Senegalese ===
About 170 Senegalese are living in Kuwait.

=== South Africans ===
About 1,000 South Africans are living in Kuwait.

== Central Asian populations ==
=== Afghanis ===
About 15,000 Afghanis are living in Kuwait.

=== Kyrgyz ===
About 14 Kyrgyz are living in Kuwait.

== East Asian populations ==
=== Chinese ===
About 5,000 Chinese are living in Kuwait.

=== South and North Koreans ===
Koreans in Kuwait first arrived in 1975 as employees of South Korean construction companies, although the two countries did not establish formal relations until June 1979. By this time, Kuwait had already become the second-most popular Middle Eastern destination for Korean workers behind Saudi Arabia; by that time, 13,813 Korean workers had already come to Kuwait. However, Kuwait would soon lose the second-place position, being surpassed by Libya in 1981 and Iraq in 1982. Koreans in Kuwait generally did not receive a welcome from or assimilate to the local society; in common with Indians, Filipinos, and Pakistanis, they were described as being at the bottom of the social structure, "ridiculed and stripped of their rights". Nor did they spend much of their money locally; as meals and housing were provided for them in their work camps, it was estimated that they remitted 80% of their earnings back to South Korea. In spite of these difficulties, between 1975 and 1985, 63,898 South Korean workers came to Kuwait, and as late as 1990, roughly 10,000 were estimated to remain. Kuwait's only school for Korean nationals, the Kuwait Hangul School, was established in 1991. Most South Koreans returned home in the following decade, and as of 2011, only 1,000 South Korean nationals resided in the country. There were no known former South Korean nationals with Kuwaiti nationality; six were international students, and the remainder had other kinds of visas.

There was formerly a small contingent of South Korean soldiers in Kuwait, who numbered 170. South Korean civilian employees from the United States Army's Camp Casey in Dongducheon, Gyeonggi-do have been deployed to bases in Kuwait, including Camp Arifjan, in support of the US Army. In 2005, a group calling itself Kuwait Mujahideen claimed to have killed a Korean national as part of an attack on a US Army base in Umm Al-Hayman near Al Ahmadi.

North Korean companies have established a greater presence in Kuwait recent years, and the government of South Korea estimated that there are roughly three or four thousand North Korean construction workers in the country as of 2004. Air Koryo, the national airline of North Korea, began operating weekly flights between Pyongyang and Kuwait City in 2011.

A firm stated that as of 2013, about 4,000 North Koreans are living in Kuwait.

A firm stated that as of 2015, about 1,500 South Koreans are living in Kuwait.

=== Mongols ===
About 20 Mongols are living in Kuwait.

=== Taiwanese ===
About 30 - 50 Taiwanese are living in Kuwait.

== South Asian populations ==
=== Bangladeshis ===
About 181,265 Bangladeshis are living in Kuwait.

=== Indians ===
The Indian community in Kuwait includes Indian expats, as well as Kuwaiti citizens of Indian origin. According to the Indian ministry of external affairs, there are around 1,020,000 Indians as on 31 December 2020, constituting the largest expatriate community in Kuwait.

There are 17 Indian schools in Kuwait affiliated to the Central Board of Secondary Education (CBSE). There were 164 Indian community Associations earlier registered with the Indian Embassy of Kuwait. Following introduction of a re-registration requirement, 106 of these Indian community Associations have once again registered with the Embassy and the number of registered Associations is growing at a steady pace.

=== Nepalis ===
About 101,193 Nepalis are living in Kuwait.

=== Pakistanis ===
The population of Pakistanis in Kuwait is around 100,000 (December 2020). The former Pakistani chargé d'affaires in Kuwait has given a higher estimate of 150,000 in 2009. There are many Pakistani schools in Kuwait.

=== Sri Lankans ===
There are 99,858 Sri Lankans living and working in Kuwait in 2016.

== Southeast Asian and Oceanian populations ==
=== Australians ===
The Australian community residing in Kuwait has 800 people working in various sectors, especially in the oil and gas sector. It is a qualified community that includes many professionals from various fields.

=== Burmese ===
About 200 Burmese are living in Kuwait.

=== Cambodians ===
About 47 Cambodians are living in Kuwait.

=== Filipinos ===
There are roughly 241,000 (as of December 2020) Filipinos in Kuwait. Most are migrant workers, and approximately 60% of Filipinos in Kuwait are employed as domestic workers.

In 2011, Kuwait was the sixth-largest destination of Overseas Filipino Workers, with 65,000 hired or rehired in the nation in 2011, and accordingly Kuwait has been an important source of remittances back to the Philippines, with over $105 million USD being remitted in 2009. Nine Filipino banks have correspondent accounts with banks in Kuwait to allow for remittance transfers.

There is a Filipino Worker's Resource Center (FWRC) located in Jabriya, and it provides refuge for Filipino workers in Kuwait who have "[experienced] various forms of maltreatment from their employers such as fatigue, non-payment of salaries," as well as "lack of food [and] physical, verbal and sexual abuse". Through assistance from the FWRC, the Philippine Embassy in Kuwait, the Philippine Overseas Employment Administration, and Overseas Workers' Welfare Administration, hundreds of Filipinos in Kuwait have been repatriated to the Philippines due to these issues.

Kuwait had the largest number of voters registered under the Overseas Absentee Voting Act eligible to vote in the 2013 Philippine general election.

=== Indonesians ===
28,954 Indonesians reside in Kuwait as of 2020.

=== Malaysians ===
About 300 Malaysians are living in Kuwait.

=== Vietnamese ===
About 400 Vietnamese are living in Kuwait.

== North and South American populations ==
=== Americans ===
About 30,000 United States nationals live in Kuwait.

=== Argentinians ===
About 100 Argentinians are living in Kuwait.

=== Brazilians ===
About 300 Brazilians are living in Kuwait.

=== Canadians ===
An estimated 7,000 Canadians reside in Kuwait and work in important sectors such engineering, finance, government, academia, health, and the oil industry.

In 2006, Canadian servicemen who fought in the first Gulf War were given the Liberation of Kuwait Medal by Kuwait. Thirty Canadian soldiers who served in the first Gulf War were honored by the Kuwaiti Embassy in Canada in February 2020.

In 2019, there were approximately 450 Kuwaiti students pursuing their studies in Canada, mostly in medicine. In 2015, Algonquin College became the first Canadian college in Kuwait.

=== Guyanese ===
About 2 Guyanese are living in Kuwait.

=== Mexicans ===
About 120 - 150 Mexicans are living in Kuwait.

=== Nicaraguans ===
About 40 Nicaraguans are living in Kuwait.

=== Peruvians ===
About 10 Peruvians are living in Kuwait.

=== Venezuelans ===
About 400 Venezuelans are living in Kuwait.

== European populations ==
=== Britons ===
About 4,000 Britons live in Kuwait.(Kuwait was a British Protectorate from 1899 to 1961.)

=== Czech ===
About 50 Czech are living in Kuwait.

=== Danes ===
About 200 Danes are living in Kuwait.

"There are some Danes married to Kuwaitis, and Danes working in several high-level positions. There are people in the oil, hospitality, pharmaceutical and bakery sectors. Did you know that the first excavation on Failaka Island in Kuwait was headed by a Dane in the 1950s? Many artifacts were uncovered there, and we traced the origins of the first settlement,"

— Ole E. Moseby, Danish ambassador of Kuwait

=== Germans ===
About 500 - 600 Germans are living in Kuwait.

=== Greeks ===
About 250 Greeks are living in Kuwait.

=== Hungarians ===
About 300 Hungarians are living in Kuwait.

=== Poles ===
About 300 Poles are living in Kuwait.

=== Romanians ===
About 800 Romanians are living in Kuwait.

=== Slovaks ===
About 100 - 150 Slovaks are living in Kuwait.

=== Slovenes ===
About <50 Slovenes are living in Kuwait.

=== Spaniards ===
About 500 Spaniards are living in Kuwait.

=== Swiss ===
About 105 Swiss are living in Kuwait.

=== Ukrainians ===
About 300 Ukrainians are living in Kuwait.

== See also ==
- Demographics of Kuwait
