= Order of Kuwait =

Order of Kuwait (Wisam Mubarak al-Kabir)

Awarded by Kuwait
- Type: Order
- Awarded for: Outstanding service to the nation
- Status: Currently constituted
- Sovereign: Mishal Al-Ahmad Al-Jaber Al-Sabah

Precedence
- Next (higher): Order of Mubarak the Great
- Next (lower): None

The Order of Kuwait (Wisam al-Kuwait) is an award given by the State of Kuwait. It ranks below the Order of Mubarak the Great.

The Order of Kuwait was founded in 1974 by Amir Sabah III. It was reformed and modified in 1991. It is awarded "For outstanding service to the nation".

== Grades ==
The Order of Kuwait is awarded in one of eight grades. In descending order:

- Riband of the Special Class
- 1st Class
- Medallion of the Special Class
- Medallion of the 1st Class
- 2nd Class
- 3rd Class
- 4th Class
- 5th Class

== Insignia ==
Ribbons
Special Class	First Class

== Notable recipients ==
- Mohamed bin Zayed Al Nahyan, 1995
- King Salman of Saudi Arabia, 2016
