= Hearing and Speech Agency of Baltimore =

U.S. nonprofit organization

HASA is a social benefit 501(c)(3) organization located in Baltimore, Maryland, that specializes in facilitating communication. Established in 1926, the organization provides special education services through Gateway School, audiology and speech-language services through its Clinical Services Department, and interpreting services for the deaf through its CIRS Interpreting Department.

== History and mission ==
Established in 1926 as the Speech Reader's League of Baltimore by Dr. Olive A. Whildin, the League began as a community center for the hard of hearing. In 1930 the League was renamed the Baltimore League for the Hard of Hearing, then the Baltimore Hearing Society in 1948, and finally the Hearing and Speech Agency of Metropolitan Baltimore in 1966. HASA legitimized itself over time with connections to state and national organizations. In 1927, the League was inducted into the American Federation of Organizations for the Hard of Hearing. Though initially rejected from the Community Fund (now United Way) in 1936, the League was granted membership upon re-application in 1940.

For the next twenty years, the League (known as the Society starting in 1948) continued with its audiology services until 1960 with the inauguration of its speech-language clinical program. Three years prior, Gateway School was started as a pilot program by the Association for Children with Communicative Disorders (which was merely the board of directors at the Society). With some success, Gateway became an independent partner program of the Society in 1960 in conjunction with the Society's new speech clinic. However, the two programs had limited success separately, and based on the 1965 recommendations of the Health and Welfare Council of Baltimore, Gateway School and the Baltimore Hearing Society merged in 1966 to create The Hearing and Speech Agency of Metropolitan Baltimore. The organization continued to provide just audiology and speech–language pathology services to children and adults until 1986 with the inauguration of the Centralized Interpreter Referral Service (CIRS). From that point on, HASA began offering American Sign Language services to the Deaf community, promoting a manual language program in addition to its spoken language program. With expanded programs and a solidified mission, HASA moved to its permanent address at 5900 Metro Drive in Seton Business Park in 2003 where it continues to serve the community.

== Services provided ==
=== Audiology ===
HASA's audiology team serves almost 1,000 clients per year, providing hearing tests, hearing aid evaluations, custom hearing protection, auditory processing evaluations, and more for pediatric and adult patients. HASA's audiology department was the founding one for the organization in 1926 when it was the Speech Readers' League. At that time, the League was offering hearing aid demonstrations and coordinating hearing aid distribution in the hard-of-hearing community in Baltimore. Since then the organization has expanded its efforts to include a full range of services.

=== Speech–language services ===
The speech–language pathology program at HASA also serves nearly 1000 patients per year, with over 7,300 hours of therapeutic sessions. In addition to its speech-language pathology program, HASA hosts the Center for Fluency Enhancement complete with therapy, support groups, family education, and advocacy for individuals who stutter. With the inauguration of the speech therapy program in 1960, HASA's original focus was to provide speech-language services to primarily pediatric patients. However, as services expanded the program moved to include the adult population in Baltimore.

=== Education ===
Having been established as a section of HASA in 1966 with the uniting of the two organizations, Gateway School continues to serve children ages 2–12 with communication challenges related to autism, speech–language disability, developmental delay, medical complications, or children who are deaf or hard-of-hearing. Though Gateway School is offered as an 11-month non-public special education school, HASA's educational services go beyond those with communication challenges: in 2016, HASA introduced its new Child Care Program for children ages 2–5 with and without communication difficulties

=== ASL interpreting ===
CIRS Interpreting at HASA provides American Sign Language (ASL) interpreters for the deaf and hard-of-hearing all across Maryland. CIRS offers both on-site and remote video interpreting services, as well as ASL classes both on-site and off-site, Deaf awareness workshops, and internships for students of Deaf studies and Interpreting. HASA's CIRS Interpreting services include:

- Sign Language Interpreter and Oral Transliterators
- A ten-week, noncredit courses in American Sign Language at HASA headquarters
- Off-site ASL courses and Deaf Awareness workshops for organizations

== Conditions treated ==
- Aphasia
- Apraxia
- Auditory processing disorder
- Autism spectrum disorder
- Developmental disability
- Down syndrome
- Fragile X
- Hearing loss
- Language based learning disability
- Speech and language impairment
- Speech sound disorder
- Stuttering
- Tinnitus
- Transgender voice & communication therapy
- Voice therapy
