= Order of Mubarak the Great =

Kuwaiti chivalric order

Order of Mubarak the Great (Wisam Mubarak al-Kabir)

Awarded by Kuwait
- Type: Order
- Awarded for: Heads of State and Royals.
- Status: Currently constituted
- Sovereign: Mishal Al-Ahmad Al-Jaber Al-Sabah
- Grades: Collar; Grand Cordon

Precedence
- Next (lower): Order of Kuwait
- Ribbon bar of the order

The Order of Mubarak the Great (Wisam Mubarak al-Kabir) is a knighthood order of Kuwait.

== History ==
The Order was founded on 16 July 1974 by the national government to celebrate the memory of Mubarak Al-Sabah called the Great, Sheikh of Kuwait from 1896 to 1915, who succeeded in 1897 in obtaining an independence recognition from the Ottoman Empire in favour of Kuwait.

== Recipients ==
The Order is awarded to Heads of State and foreign Sovereigns and to members of foreign royal families in sign of friendship.

- Mohammad Reza Pahlavi (1974)
- Hussein of Jordan (1974)
- Soeharto (1977)
- Elizabeth II (1979)
- Jigme Singye Wangchuck (1990)
- George H. W. Bush (1993)
- Charles, Prince of Wales (1993)
- Bill Clinton (1994)
- Naruhito, then Crown Prince of Japan (1995)
- Mahathir Mohamad (1997)
- Émile Lahoud (2000)
- Abdullah of Saudi Arabia (2000)
- Mohammed VI of Morocco (2002)
- Hamad bin Isa Al Khalifa (2004)
- Michel Suleiman (2009)
- Nicolas Sarkozy (2009)
- Ilham Aliyev (2009)
- Qaboos bin Said al Said (2009)
- Bashar al-Assad (2010)
- Giorgio Napolitano (2010)
- Tamim bin Hamad Al Thani (2013)
- Hassanal Bolkiah (2015)
- Salman of Saudi Arabia (2016)
- Kolinda Grabar-Kitarović (2017)
- Haitham bin Tariq (2024)
- Narendra Modi (2024)
- Emmanuel Macron (2026)

== Insignia ==
The collar of the Order is composed of a golden medallion with a decorative ring with floral motifs, with a central medallion showing a sailboat (one of, the national emblems of the state). The body of the collar is alternating with squares of blue enamel bearing a sailboat and a 10-pointed star in white enamel bearing in the center the monogram of Kuwait.

The ribbon of Grand Cordon is navy blue with white stripes on each side.

== Grades ==
- Collar (Qiladat al-Mubarak al-Kabir) to Heads of State
- Grand Cordon (Qashah al-Mubarak al-Kabir) to foreign Heirs Apparent and senior Princes
