= Al-Ahsa =

Al-Ahsa or Al-Hasa may refer to:

- Al-Ahsa Oasis, an oasis region in eastern Saudi Arabia
  - Al-Ahsa Eyalet, or Lahsa Eyalet, a subdivision of the Ottoman Empire, now part of Saudi Arabia, Kuwait, and Qatar
  - Al-Ahsa Governorate, a governorate in Saudi Arabia
  - Hofuf, or Al-Ahsa or Al-Hasa, a major city
    - Al-Ahsa International Airport, Hofuf
- Wadi al-Hasa, in Jordan

== See also ==
- Ahsa (disambiguation)
- Hasa (disambiguation)
