= Jleeb Al-Shuyoukh =

Jileeb Al-Shiyukh جليب الشيوخ Jilīb l-iŠyūkh
- Area
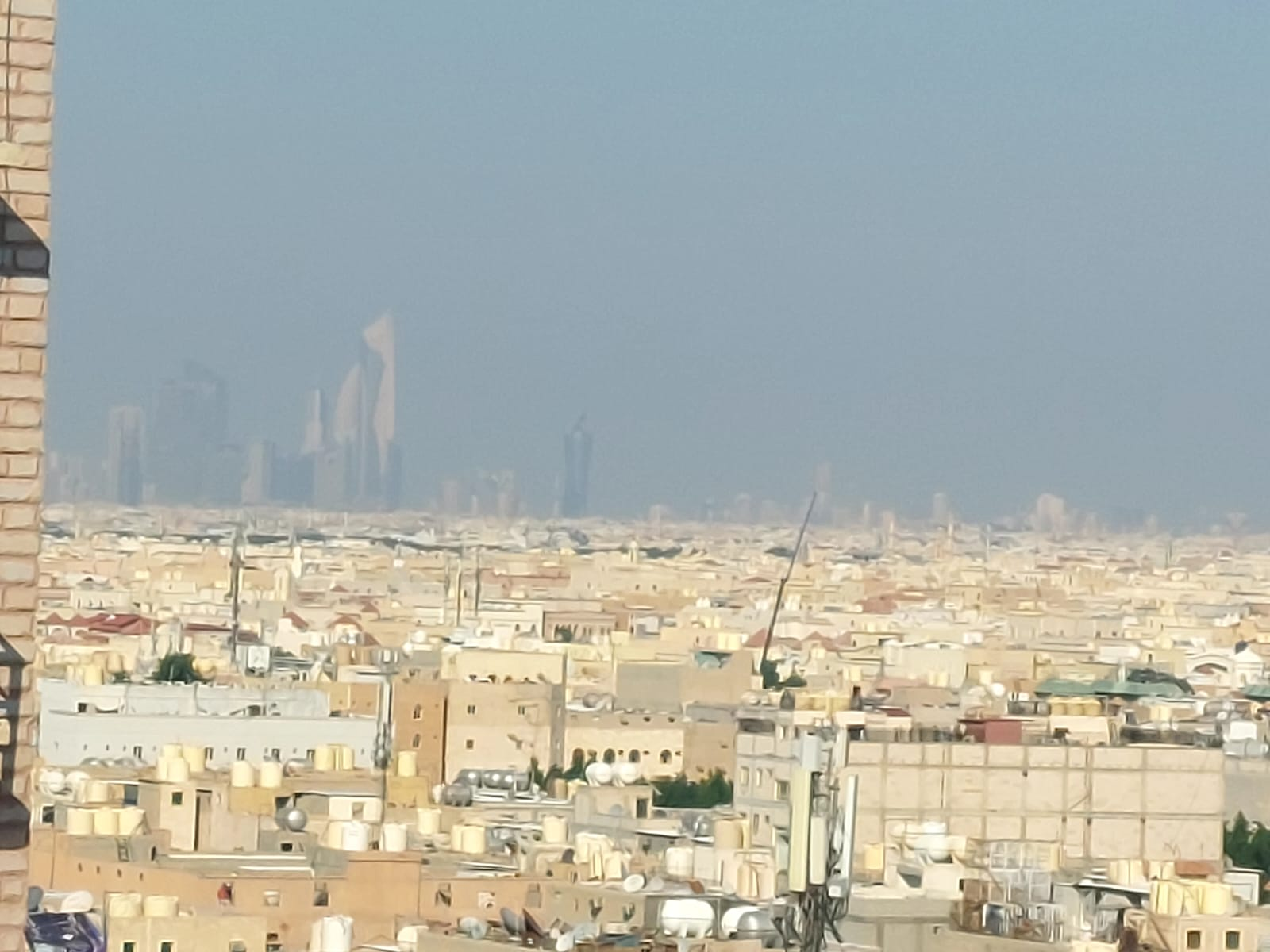
- Jleeb's Skyline.The tower in back is Al Hamra Tower
- Etymology: lit. Sheikhs' Well
- Nicknames: Abbasiya (Block 4) and Hasawi (Block 2 and 3)
- Interactive map of Jileeb Al-Shiyukh
- Location of Jilīb in Kuwait
- Coordinates: 29°16′0″N 47°56′0″E; Jilīb l-iŠyūkh on Kuwait's Official GIS Maps
- Country: Kuwait
- Governorate: Farwaniya Governorate
- Block: 5

Area
  - Total: 10 km^{2} (3.9 sq mi)
- Elevation: 60 m (200 ft)

Population (June 2024)
  - Total: 266,883
  - Density: 27,000/km^{2} (69,000/sq mi)
- Time zone: GMT+3
- Electoral Circle: 4th
- Co-Op Society: Jleeb Al-Shuyoukh Co-Op Society
- Location: Block 4
- Chair: Thāmir Radin l-iMṭēri

Jleeb Al-Shuyoukh or Jileeb Al-Shiyukh (Gulf Arabic: جليب الشيوخ, pronounced [d͡ʒɪliːb lɪʃjuːχ]), often shortened to just Jilīb/Jileeb (الجليب), is one of the oldest and most congested areas in Kuwait. It is located within Farwaniya Governorate and borders Kuwait International Airport. It is largely inhabited by expatriates from countries such as India, Pakistan, Bangladesh, Sri Lanka, Egypt and Syria. There are even many Dawoodi Bohras residing in Jleeb-Al-Shuyoukh.

== Etymology ==
The term jilīb جليب is a Kuwaiti Arabic term that means (water) well, whereas Shyūkh شيوخ is the Arabic plural for sheikh. The area was named after a water well that was dug by two of Kuwait's Emir Mubarak The Great's brothers.

== History ==
Jleeb Al-Shuyoukh has a rich history, reflecting the broader socio-economic changes in Kuwait. Originally a predominantly Kuwaiti area, it saw a demographic shift as expatriates moved in for work opportunities. Over the years, the area has grown to accommodate a diverse population, leading to its current state as a densely populated neighborhood.

== Demographics ==
As of June 2024, the population of Jleeb Al-Shuyoukh was estimated to be 266,883, with a population density of 27,000 per square kilometer. The majority of residents are expatriates from South Asia and the Middle East. The high population density has led to several social and infrastructural challenges.

== Infrastructure and facilities ==
Jleeb Al-Shuyoukh is characterized by its crowded streets, old buildings, and inadequate infrastructure. Despite being one of the oldest areas, it lacks modern amenities and adequate public services. The following are key facilities and infrastructure in the area:

=== Schools ===
Jleeb Al-Shuyoukh hosts several schools, primarily catering to the expatriate community. Notable schools include:

- Indian Educational School (Bharatiya Vidya Bhavan)
- Indian Central School
- United Indian School (Abbasiya)
- Integrated Indian School (Abbasiya)
- Kuwait Indian School (Abbasiya)
- Al-Rashed Indian School
- Indian Learners Own Academy
- Smart Indian School
- Pakistan English School & College
- Nottingham British School
- United International Indian School (Hasawi) .

=== Healthcare ===
The area has limited healthcare facilities, with a few clinics and pharmacies catering to the large population. The lack of adequate healthcare services is a significant concern for residents.

=== Transportation ===
Jleeb Al-Shuyoukh has a large population that utilizes the public transport systems run by the Kuwait Public Transport Company (KPTC), Citybus (a Boodai group subsidiary), and KGL Transportation. The area is flanked by major roads such as the Ghazali Expressway and the 6th Ring Road and is less than 5 km from Kuwait International Airport. Taxis are widely available, and fares are typically pre-bargained.

=== Iblis Roundabout ===
Iblis Roundabout or The Devil's Roundabout is a roundabout in Jilīb that has caused controversy and amusement in Kuwait. The roundabout is notorious for alleged illegal activities, though some dispute this classification and claim activities there are more innocuous than portrayed.

=== Al-Hasawi (Block 2 & 3) ===
Hasawi or Al-Hasawi is an area in Jleeb Al Shuyoukh. It derives its name from Mubarak Al-Hasawi (full name being Mubarak Abdul Aziz Al-Hasawi), who was a Kuwaiti businessman and landowner. He acquired large portions of land in this semi-rural area as it underwent early modern expansion. During the late 20ᵗʰ century, Al-Hasawi developed densely, eventually having many expats move in from India, Pakistan, Sri Lanka, Egypt, Syria, Filipinos, Ethiopia, Ghana, Nigeria, Sudan.

=== The Market area (Block 1) ===
Block 1 and some parts of Block 2 have the Jleeb Co-operative Society and Grand Hyper, Nesto, Street food vendors, Restaurants, Jewellers, Travelling companies, et cetera. This block is also having residential areas but there is a mall here filled with markets, giving it the name The Market area.

Block 1 is not associated with Hasawi or Abbasiya, as it is a Jleeb Al Shuyoukh residential area.
