= Mehdi =

Mehdi, Mahadi, or Mehedi (Arabic: المَهْدِي, romanized: al-mehdi) is a masculine given name and surname of Arabic origin. It means "rightly guided" in Arabic. It is a variation of the name Mahdi. Notable people with the name include:

== Given name ==
=== Mahadi ===
- Mahadi Faisal, Bangladeshi singer and composer
- Mahadi Che Ngah (born 1959), Malaysian politician
- Mahadi Sinambela (1947–2019), Indonesian politician
- Mahadi Wasli (born 1966), Bruneian diplomat

=== Mehdi ===
- Mehdi Abbasov (1960–1992), Azerbaijani war hero
- Mehdi Abdesmad (born 1991), Canadian-American football player
- Mehdi Abdi (born 1998), Iranian footballer
- Mehdi Abdi (footballer, born 1989) (born 1989), Iranian footballer
- Mehdi Abeid (born 1992), Algerian footballer
- Mehdi Abrishamchi (born 1947), Iranian dissident
- Mehdi Abtahi (born 1963), Iranian footballer
- Mehdi Addadi (born 1978), Algerian swimmer
- Mehdi Aghavali (born 1982), Iranian wrestling referee
- Mehdi Ahmadi (born 1966), Iranian painter, film actor, and artist
- Mehdi Aidet (born 1953), Algerian athlete
- Mehdi Akhavan-Sales (1929–1990), Iranian poet
- Mehdi Alamah (born 1991), Jordanian footballer
- Mehdi Aliyari (born 1989), Iranian Greco-Roman wrestler
- Mehdi Amini (born 1998), Iranian footballer
- Mehdi Aminrazavi (born 1957), Iranian scholar of philosophy and mysticism
- Mehdi Amirabadi (born 1979), Iranian footballer
- Mehdi Ansari (born 1994), Iranian swimmer
- Mehdi Siraj Ansari (1895–1961), Iranian Islamic scholar
- Mehdi Araghi (1930–1979), Iranian political dissident
- Mehdi Asgarkhani (born 1948), Iranian footballer
- Mehdi Assous (born 1977), Algerian boxer
- Mehdi Attar-Ashrafi (1948–2021), Iranian weightlifter
- Mehdi Ben Attia (born 1968), Tunisian film director, screenwriter, and actor
- Mehdi Ayachi (born 1985), Tunisian singer and composer
- Mehdi Azaiez (born 1974), French Islamic studies scholar
- Mehdi Azar (1901–1994), Iranian physician and politician
- Mehdi Azizian (born 1956), Iranian businessman and economist
- Mehdi Baala (born 1978), French middle-distance runner
- Mehdi Baaloudj (born 2001), French-Algerian footballer
- Mehdi Badrlou (born 1986), Iranian footballer
- Mehdi Baghdad (born 1985), French mixed martial artist
- Mehdi Bagheri (born 1980), Iranian kamancheh player and composer
- Mehdi Bahadori (born 1933), Iranian mechanical engineer
- Mehdi Bahmad, Moroccan-Canadian singer, songwriter, producer, director, and visual artist
- Mehdi Bajestani (born 1974), Iranian actor
- Mehdi Bakeri (1954–1985), Iranian Army officer
- Mehdi Baki (born 1988), French actor, dancer, and choreographer
- Mehdi Bali (born 1997), Iranian Greco-Roman wrestler
- Mehdi Ballouchy (born 1983), Moroccan footballer
- Mehdi Bamdad (died 1973), Iranian civil servant and historian
- Mehdi Bardhi (1927–1994), Kosovar linguist, author, and teacher
- Mehdi Ben Barka (1920–??), Moroccan politician
- Mehdi Barkeshli (1912–1988), Iranian musician, composer, violinist, and researcher
- Mehdi Barsaoui (born 1984), Tunisian filmmaker
- Mehdi Bashiri (born 1992), Iranian scientist, inventor, academic, and writer
- Mehdi Bayani (1906–1968), Iranian calligrapher, writer, researcher, and professor
- Mehdi Bayat (born 1979), French-Iranian businessman
- Mehdi Bazargan (1907–1995), Iranian politician
- Mehdi Bazargard (born 1979), Iranian volleyball player
- Mehdi Qoli Beg (died 1618), Chagatai ruler in Khorasan
- Mehdi Behzad (born 1936), Iranian mathematician
- Mehdi Belhadj (born 1995), French runner
- Mehdi Benabid (born 1998), Moroccan footballer
- Mehdi Benaldjia (born 1991), Algerian footballer
- Mehdi Benchikhoune (born 1996), Algerian footballer
- Mehdi Beneddine (born 1996), French footballer
- Mehdi Benhamouda (born 1995), French racing cyclist
- Mehdi Bennani (born 1983), Moroccan racing driver
- Mehdi Bennouna (died 2010), Moroccan writer and journalist
- Mehdi Bensib (born 1994), Tunisian footballer
- Mehdi Hassan Bhatti (born 1955), Pakistani politician
- Mehdi Bijari (born 1983), Iranian handball player
- Mehdi Bouadla (born 1982), French-Algerian boxer
- Mehdi Boudjemaa (born 1998), French footballer
- Mehdi Boukamir (born 2004), Belgian-Moroccan footballer
- Mehdi Boukassi (born 1996), Algerian footballer
- Mehdi Bounou (born 1997), Belgian footballer
- Mehdi Bourabia (born 1991), Moroccan footballer
- Mehdi Bozorgmehr (born 1971), Iranian musician and composer
- Mehdi Bushati (born 1939), Albanian footballer
- Mehdi Carcela (born 1989), Belgian-Moroccan footballer
- Mehdi Cerbah (1953–2021), Algerian footballer
- Mehdi Chaambi (born 1965), Tunisian wrestler
- Mehdi Chahiri (born 1996), French footballer
- Mehdi Chahkoutahzadeh (born 1989), Iranian footballer
- Mehdi Chamanara (born 1987), Iranian footballer
- Mehdi Chamran (born 1941), Iranian architect and politician
- Mehdi Charef (born 1952), French-Algerian film director and screenwriter
- Mehdi Abid Charef (born 1980), Algerian football referee
- Mehdi Ben Cheikh (born 1979), Tunisian volleyball player
- Mehdi Cheriet (born 1987), French-Algerian basketball player
- Mehdi Çoba (born 2000), Albanian footballer
- Mehdi Courgnaud (born 1990), French footballer
- Mehdi Daghagheleh (born 1990), Iranian footballer
- Mehdi Dagher (born 1990), Iranian footballer
- Mehdi Danesh-Yazdi (born 1952), Iranian diplomat
- Mehdi Davatgari (born 1966), Iranian lawyer and politician
- Mehdi Dehbi (born 1985), Belgian actor and theatre director
- Mehdi Ben Dhifallah (born 1983), Tunisian footballer
- Mehdi Dibaj (1935–1994), Iranian Christian pastor and martyr
- Mehdi Difallah (born 1984), French basketball referee
- Mehdi Dinvarzadeh (born 1955), Iranian football player and coach
- Mehdi Dorval (born 2001), French-Algerian footballer
- Mehdi Eslami (footballer, born 1985) (born 1985), Iranian footballer
- Mehdi Eslami (footballer, born 1992) (born 1992), Iranian footballer
- Mehdi Essadiq (born 1986), Moroccan triathlete
- Mehdi Essoussi (born 2001), Tunisian footballer
- Mehdi Fakhimzadeh (born 1942), Iranian actor, director, screenwriter, and producer
- Mehdi Fat'hi (1939–2004), Iranian actor
- Mehdi Fennouche (born 1993), French-Algerian footballer
- Mehdi Filali (born 1999), French karateka
- Mehdi Fonounizadeh (born 1962), Iranian footballer
- Mehdi Forough (1911–2008), Iranian scholar and author
- Mehdi Frashëri (1872–1963), Albanian intellectual and politician
- Mehdi Moradi Ganjeh (born 1964), Iranian wrestler
- Mehdi Gara (born 1981), Tunisian volleyball player
- Mehdi Fard Ghaderi (born 1986), Iranian film director, screenwriter, and film producer
- Mehdi Ghadyanloo (born 1981), Iranian artist, painter, and muralist
- Mehdi Gharbi (born 1999), Tunisian sailor
- Mehdi Ghayedi (born 1998), Iranian footballer
- Mehdi Ghazanfari (born 1960), Iranian politician
- Mehdi El Ghazouani (born 1976), Moroccan long jumper
- Mehdi Ghezali (born 1979), Swedish bank robber
- Mehdi Ghorbani (born 1988), Iranian boxer
- Mehdi Ghoreishi (born 1990), Iranian footballer
- Mehdi El Glaoui (born 1956), French actor, director, and screenwriter
- Mehdi Golshani (1939–2026), Iranian theoretical physicist
- Mehdi Goudarzi (born 2003), Iranian footballer
- Mehdi Guerrouad (born 1981), French footballer
- Mehdi Guliyev (1923–1976), Azerbaijani Army soldier
- Mehdi Hacibabayev (1871–1925), Azerbaijani social and political figure
- Mehdi Hadiha (born 1989), Iranian-Swedish judo and jiujitsu athlete
- Mehdi Ait El Hadj (born 1998), Moroccan-French kickboxer
- Mehdi Hafsi (born 1978), French-Tunisian basketball player
- Mehdi Hajati (born 1979), Iranian politician
- Mehdi bey Hajinski (1879–1941), Azerbaijani actor, publicist, and statesman
- Mehdi Hajizadeh (born 1981), Iranian wrestler
- Mehdi Halıcı (1927–2008), Turkish writer
- Mehdi Hamama (born 1985), Algerian swimmer
- Mehdi Harb (born 1979), Tunisian footballer
- Mehdi Hasan (born 1979), British-American journalist, broadcaster, and author
- Mehdi Hasan (cricketer, born 1990) (born 1990), Indian cricketer
- Mehdi Hasan (diplomat), Bangladeshi diplomat
- Mehdi Hasan (Indian cricketer) (born 1990), Indian cricketer
- Mehdi Hasan (Pakistani journalist) (1937–2022), Pakistani journalist
- Mehdi Hashemi (1944–1987), Iranian cleric and official
- Mehdi Hashemi (actor) (born 1946), Iranian actor, screenwriter, and director
- Mehdi Hasheminasab (born 1974), Iranian footballer
- Mehdi Hashemnejad (born 2001), Iranian footballer
- Mehdi Hassan (1927–2012), Pakistani ghazal singer
- Mehdi Qoli Hedayat (1863–1955), Iranian politician
- Mehdi Hetemaj (born 1997), Austrian footballer
- Mehdi Hmili, Tunisian filmmaker
- Mehdi Hosseini (born 1979), Persian composer
- Mehdi Hosseini (footballer) (born 1993), Iranian footballer
- Mehdi Hosseininia (born 1981), Iranian actor
- Mehdi Houryar (born 1945), Iranian wrestler
- Mehdi Huseyn (1909–1965), Azerbaijani writer and critic
- Mehdi Huseynzade (1918–1944), Azerbaijani guerrilla and scout
- Mehdi El Idrissi (born 1977), Moroccan business executive
- Mehdi Isazadeh (born 1962), Iranian politician
- Mehdi Rusi Khan Ivanov (1875–1968), Iranian court photographer
- Mehdi Izadi (born 1998), Iranian footballer
- Mehdi Jafari (born 1969), Iranian film director, screenwriter, and cinematographer
- Mehdi Jafarpour (born 1984), Iranian footballer
- Mehdi Jahangiri (born 1971), Iranian economist and banker
- Mehdi Shabzendedar Jahromi (born 1953), Iranian Shia jurist
- Mehdi Jamalinejad (born 1969), Iranian writer and politician
- Mehdi Jami (born 1961), Iranian journalist
- Mehdi Jannatov (born 1992), Azerbaijani footballer
- Mehdi Qoli Khan Javanshir (died 1845), Khan of the Karabakh Khanate
- Mehdi Jazayeri, Iranian academic
- Mehdi Jdi (born 1988), Moroccan tennis player
- Mehdi Jeannin (born 1991), French footballer
- Mehdi Jelodarzadeh (born 1978), Iranian athlete
- Mehdi Jomaa (born 1962), Tunisian engineer and politician
- Mehdi Nawaz Jung (1894–1967), Indian bureaucrat
- Mehdi Kacem (born 1986), French-Algerian footballer
- Mehdi Belhaj Kacem, French-Tunisian writer, philosopher, and actor
- Mehdi Kadi (born 1994), French footballer
- Mehdi Kamrani (born 1982), Iranian basketball player
- Mehdi Karampour (born 1976), Iranian film director, producer, writer, and photographer
- Mehdi Karbalaei (born 1993), Iranian footballer
- Mehdi Karimian (born 1980), Iranian footballer
- Mehdi Karroubi (born 1937), Iranian Shia cleric and politician
- Mehdi Kazemi (born 1989), British-Iranian asylum seeker
- Mehdi Kerrouche (born 1985), French footballer
- Mehdi Khalaji (born 1973), Iranian-American writer, scholar of Islamic studies, and political analyst
- Mehdi Khalil (born 1991), Lebanese footballer
- Mehdi Khalis (born 1989), British-Moroccan footballer
- Mehdi Al-Khalissi (died 1925), Iraqi Twelver Shi'a Marja'
- Mehdi Khalsi (born 1986), Moroccan boxer
- Mehdi Abbas Khan (born 1958), Pakistani politician
- Mehdi Khazali (born 1965), Iranian publisher, physician, and blogger
- Mehdi Khchab (born 1991), Belgian footballer
- Mehdi Kheiri (born 1983), Iranian footballer
- Mehdi-Selim Khelifi (born 1992), Algerian cross-country skier
- Mehdi Khodabakhshi (born 1991), Iranian-Serbian Taekwondo practitioner
- Mehdi Kiani (footballer, born 1978) (born 1978), Iranian footballer
- Mehdi Kiani (footballer, born 1987) (born 1987), Iranian footballer
- Mehdi Ahmad Kohani (born 1997), Iranian artistic gymnast
- Mehdi Kouchakzadeh (born 1959), Iranian engineer, academic, and politician
- Mehdi Lavasani (born 1947), Iranian footballer
- Mehdi Lazaar (born 1993), Belgian footballer
- Mehdi Lehaire (born 2000), Belgian footballer
- Mehdi Léris (born 1998), French footballer
- Mehdi Leroy (born 1978), French footballer
- Mehdi Loune (born 2004), German-Moroccan footballer
- Mehdi Mabrouk, Tunisian politician
- Mehdi Mahbub, Bangladeshi cricketer
- Mehdi Mahdavi (born 1984), Iranian volleyball player
- Mehdi Mahdavikia (born 1977), Iranian footballer
- Mehdi Maïzi (born 1986), Algerian–French music journalist and writer
- Mehdi Makhloufi (born 1978), French-Algerian footballer
- Mehdi Marandi (born 1986), Iranian volleyball player
- Mehdi Marzouki (born 1988), French water polo player
- Mehdi Masoud-Ansari (died 1978), Iranian footballer
- Mehdi Mchakhchekh (born 2004), Moroccan footballer
- Mehdi Mehdikhani (born 1997), Iranian footballer
- Mehdi Mehdipour (born 1994), Iranian footballer
- Mehdi Méniri (born 1977), Algerian footballer
- Mehdi Merghem (born 1997), French-Algerian footballer
- Mehdi Meriah (born 1979), Tunisian footballer
- Mehdi Messaoudi (born 1989), French-Moroccan footballer
- Mehdi Messaoudi (wrestler) (born 1990), Moroccan Greco-Roman wrestler
- Mehdi Mirdavoudi (born 1977), Iranian kick-boxer and strongman
- Mehdi Ali Mirza (1910–1961), Pakistani architect
- Mehdi Missaghieh (1927–1991), Iranian film producer and director
- Mehdi Sojoudi Moghaddam (born 1962), Iranian writer, literary translator, and scholar
- Mehdi Mohaghegh (born 1930), Iranian academic
- Mehdi Haj Mohamad (1950–2025), Iranian footballer
- Mehdi Mohammadi (born 1981), Iranian footballer
- Mehdi Mohammadi (football manager) (1952–2013), Iranian football coach
- Mehdi Agha Mohammadi, Iranian footballer
- Mehdi Mohammadpour (born 1985), Iranian footballer
- Mehdi Mohammadzadeh (born 1984), Iranian football player and coach
- Mehdi Mohsenkhah (born 2004), Iranian footballer
- Mehdi Mohsennejad (born 1998), Iranian Greco-Roman wrestler
- Mehdi Mollapour (born 1973), British-American biochemist
- Mehdi Momeni (born 1985), Iranian footballer
- Mehdi Monajati (born 1947), Iranian football player and coach
- Mehdi Mostefa (born 1983), Algerian footballer
- Mehdi Mouidi (born 1940), Moroccan alpine skier
- Mehdi Haji Mousaei (born 2004), Iranian taekwondo practitioner
- Mehdi Mousavi (born 1976), Iranian poet
- Mehdi El Moutacim (born 2000), Finnish footballer
- Mehdi Ben Mrad (born 1998), Tunisian footballer
- Mehdi Naderi (born 1973), Iranian film director
- Mehdi Nafti (born 1978), Tunisian footballer
- Mehdi Naghmi (born 1988), Moroccan footballer
- Mehdi Namli (born 1987), Moroccan footballer
- Mehdi Nasiri (born 1987), Iranian footballer
- Mehdi Nasiri (journalist) (born 1963), Iranian journalist and writer
- Mehdi Nassiroghlou, Iranian footballer
- Mehdi Nazeri, Iranian photographer
- Mehdi Nebbou, French actor
- Mehdi Noorbakhsh (born 1954), Iranian academic and political activist
- Mehdi Norowzian, Iranian-British film director
- Mehdi Nouri (born 1980), Iranian footballer
- Mehdi Oubila (born 1992), Moroccan footballer
- Mehdi Ouertani (born 1990), Tunisian footballer
- Mehdi Pakdel (born 1980), Iranian actor
- Mehdi Panzvan (born 1981), Iranian weightlifter
- Mehdi Pashazadeh (born 1973), Iranian football player and coach
- Mehdi Pirjahan (born 1999), Iranian athlete
- Mehdi Niyayesh Pour (born 1992), Iranian footballer
- Mehdi Puch (born 2004), French-Algerian footballer
- Mehdi Khan Qa'em-Maqam (1865–1918), Iranian politician
- Mehdi Qoli Khan Qajar, Iranian military commander and Khan of Erivan
- Mehdi-Qoli Mirza Qajar (died 1904), Qajar prince
- Mehdi-Khan Qasemlu, Afsharid khan of the Erivan Khanate
- Mehdi Hasan Aini Qasmi, Indian Islamic scholar and social activist
- Mehdi Rabbani (died 2025), Iranian Army officer
- Mehdi Rabbi (born 1980), Iranian short story writer
- Mehdi Hashemi Rafsanjani (born 1969), Iranian businessman
- Mehdi Rahimi (1921–1979), Iranian Army general
- Mehdi Rahimi (footballer) (born 1999), Iranian footballer
- Mehdi Rahimzadeh (born 1989), Iranian footballer
- Mehdi Rahmati (born 1983), Iranian footballer
- Mehdi Rahmouni (born 1988), French football referee
- Mehdi Rajabian (born 1989), Iranian musician
- Mehdi Rajabzadeh (born 1978), Iranian football manager and player
- Mehdi Reisfirooz (1927–2019), Iranian film director, actor, and film producer
- Mehdi Reza (born 1990), Qatari footballer
- Mehdi Younesi Rostami (born 1962), Iranian physician and politician
- Mehdi Saâda (born 1987), Tunisian footballer
- Mehdi Sabeti (born 1975), Iranian footballer
- Mehdi Saeedi (born 1979), Iranian-American artist and designer
- Mehdi Safari (born 1951), Iranian diplomat
- Mehdi Sahabi (1944–2009), Iranian translator, painter, and writer
- Mehdi Sahnoune (born 1976), French boxer
- Mehdi Sajjadi (born 1999), Iranian footballer
- Mehdi Saki (born 1974), Iranian actor, composer, and singer
- Mehdi Salehpour (born 1975), Iranian footballer
- Mehdi Samii (1918–2010), Iranian banker and economist
- Mehdi Sanaei (born 1968), Iranian academic and politician
- Mehdi Sarram, Iranian-American nuclear engineer
- Mehdi Semsar (1929–2003), Iranian journalist and translator
- Mehdi Seyed-Salehi (born 1981), Iranian footballer
- Mehdi Shabani (born 1975), Iranian film director
- Mehdi Shafaeddin (born 1945), Swiss-Iranian economist
- Mehdi Shahbazi (1942–2007), American businessman
- Mehdi Imani Shahmiri (born 1988), Iranian documentary filmmaker, producer, and screenwriter
- Mehdi Shahrokhi (born 1985), Iranian athlete
- Mehdi Qoli Khan Shamlu, Turkoman military officer
- Mehdi Sharifi (born 1992), Iranian footballer
- Mehdi Sheykh (born 1966), Iranian cleric and politician
- Mehdi Hamidi Shirazi (1914–1986), Iranian poet and university professor
- Mehdi Shiri (born 1978), Iranian footballer
- Mehdi Shiri (footballer, born 1991) (born 1991), Iranian footballer
- Mehdi Ben Slimane (born 1974), Tunisian footballer
- Mehdi Sohrabi (born 1981), Iranian racing cyclist
- Mehdi Soltani (born 1971), Iranian actor
- Mehdi Tabatabaei (1936–2018), Iranian Shia cleric and politician
- Mehdi Taghavi (born 1987), Iranian wrestler
- Mehdi Tahiri (born 1977), Moroccan tennis player
- Mehdi Tahrat (born 1990), Algerian footballer
- Mehdi Taj (born 1960), Iranian sports executive and administrator
- Mehdi Tajik (born 1979), Iranian footballer
- Mehdi Takordmioui (born 1995), Moroccan sprinter
- Mehdi Taouil (born 1983), French-Moroccan footballer
- Mehdi Taremi (born 1992), Iranian footballer
- Mehdi Tarfi (born 1993), Belgian footballer
- Mehdi Tartar (born 1972), Iranian football coach and player
- Mehdi Mirzamehdi Tehrani (born 1970), Iranian film critic, journalist, and academic
- Mehdi Terki (born 1991), Algerian footballer
- Mehdi Tikdari (born 1996), Iranian footballer
- Mehdi Tlili (born 2004), French rugby union player
- Mehdi Tolouti, Iranian boxer
- Mehdi Torkaman (born 1989), Iranian footballer
- Mehdi Vaez-Iravani, Iranian scientist, engineer, and inventor
- Mehdi Vaezi (born 1975), Iranian footballer
- Mehdigulu Khan Vafa (1855–1900), Azerbaijani lyrical poet
- Mehdi Vosoughnia (born 1971), Iranian documentary photographer and university lecturer
- Mehdi Yaghoubi (1930–2021), Iranian freestyle wrestler
- Mehdi Yahyanejad (born 1975), Iranian businessman
- Mehdi Yarrahi (born 1981), Iranian singer, musician, and activist
- Mehdi Azar Yazdi (1922–2009), Iranian writer
- Mehdi Haeri Yazdi (1923–1999), Iranian philosopher and Islamic cleric
- Mehdi Zaheer (1927–1988), Pakistani musician, singer, poet, and radio producer
- Mehdi Zakerian, Iranian scholar
- Mehdi Zamani (born 1989), Iranian athlete
- Mehdi Zana (1940–2026), Turkish politician
- Mehdi Zarghamee, Iranian academic
- Mehdi Zeffane (born 1992), Algerian footballer
- Mehdi Zeinoddin (1959–1984), Iranian Army officer
- Mehdi Zerkane (born 1999), Algerian footballer
- Mehdi Mohammed Zeyo (1962–2011), Libyan middle manager
- Mehdi Ziadi (born 1986), Moroccan tennis player
- Mehdi Zobeydi (born 1991), Iranian footballer
- Mehdi Zoubairi (born 1987), Moroccan footballer

=== Mehedi ===
- Mehedi Haque (born 1984), Bangladeshi cartoonist, comic book artist, and editor
- Mehedi Hasan (cricketer, born 2002) (born 2002), Bangladeshi cricketer
- Mehedi Maruf (born 1988), Bangladeshi cricketer
- Mehedi Hasan Mithu (born 1994), Bangladeshi footballer
- Mehedi Hasan Rana (born 1997), Bangladeshi cricketer
- Mehedi Haque Rony (born 1988), Bangladeshi cinematographer
- Mehedi Hasan Royal (born 1996), Bangladeshi footballer
- Mehedi Hasan Srabon (born 2005), Bangladeshi footballer
- Mehedi Hassan Tapu (born 1984), Bangladeshi footballer
- Mehedi Hasan Ujjal (born 1985), Bangladeshi footballer

== Surname ==
=== Mehdi ===
- Aga Syed Mehdi (1959–2000), Indian Shia leader and social activist
- Amir Mehdi (1913–1999), Pakistani mountaineer
- Anisa Mehdi, Iraqi-Canadian film director and journalist
- Asif Mehdi (1966–2021), Pakistani ghazal and playback singer
- Eqbal Mehdi (1946–2008), Pakistani painter
- Georges Mehdi (1934–2018), Brazilian-French judoka
- M. T. Mehdi (1928–1998), Iraqi-American politician and pro-Palestinian activist
- Parvez Mehdi, born Pervez Akhtar (1947–2005), Pakistani ghazal singer
- Qasim Mehdi (1941–2016), Pakistani molecular biologist
- Sahim Saleh Mehdi (born 1967), Yemeni athlete
- Tabish Mehdi (1951–2025), Indian poet, literary critic, journalist, and author
- Tanvir Mehdi (born 1972), Pakistani cricketer

== See also ==
- Mahdi (name)
- Medhi (disambiguation)
- Dik El Mehdi, a Lebanese village in the Matn District governorate of Mount Lebanon
