= Medhi (disambiguation) =

Medhi is a village in the Palghar district of Maharashtra, India.

Medhi may refer to:

== Given name ==
- Medhi Benatia (born 1987), Moroccan footballer
- Medhi Bouzzine (born 1984), French pair skater

== Surname ==
- Bishnuram Medhi (1888–1981), Indian politician, minister, and governor
- Kaliram Medhi (1880–1954), Indian writer and essayist
- Salien Medhi (died 2016), Indian lawyer and politician

== See also ==
- Mehdi, an Arabic name
