= Luna, Rajasthan =

Luna
- village
- Country: India
- State: Rajasthan
- District: Jhunjhunu
- Tehsil: Jhunjhunu

Languages
  - Official: Hindi
- Time zone: UTC+5:30 (IST)
- Postal code: 333011
- ISO 3166 code: RJ-IN
- Vehicle registration: RJ 18-

Luna is a village in Rajasthan, India, famous as the birthplace of Mehdi Hassan. It is a panchayat village in Alsisar Tehsil of Jhunjhunu District.

Luna village might be the reference town for the famous motorette 'Luna' which was manufactured by Kinetic Industries of Uttar Pradesh in the late 1980s.

== Demographics ==
In the India census of 2001, the village of Luna had a population of 1,620. Males constituted 54.7% (886) of the population and females 45.3% (734), for a gender ratio of 828 females per thousand males.
