= Farès Brahimi =

Algerian footballer (born 1988)

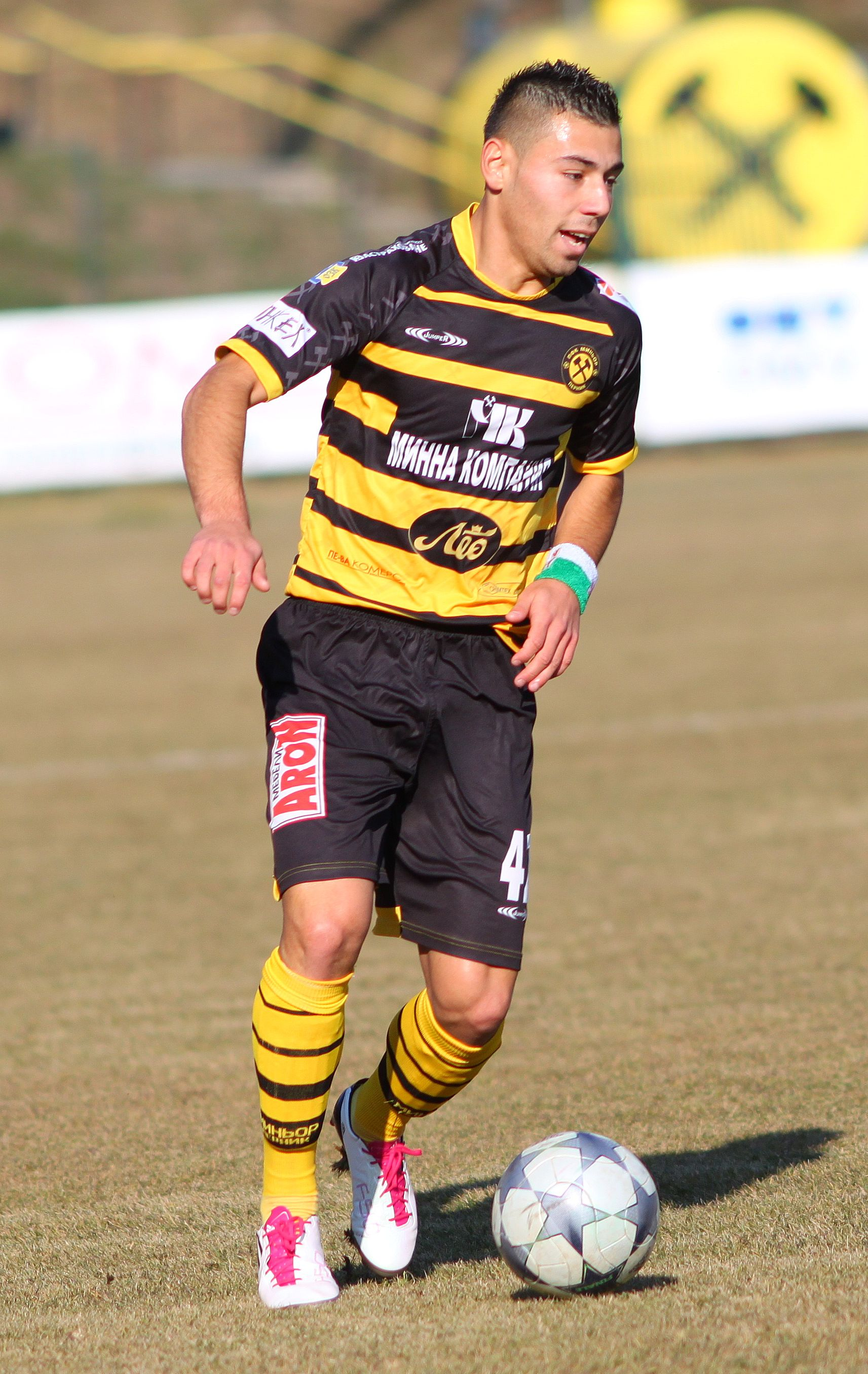

Personal information
- Full name: Farès Brahimi
- Date of birth: October 22, 1988 (age 38)
- Place of birth: Réghaïa, Algiers, Algeria
- Height: 1.76 m (5 ft 9 1/2 in)
- Position: Midfielder

Team information
- Current team: Usm Elharrach

Youth career
- –2007: Saint-Étienne

Senior career*
Years	Team	Apps	(Gls)
2007–2008	US Cognac	4	(2)
2008–2010	US Feurs	23	(21)
2011–2012	Minyor Pernik	57	(8)
2013	Montana	13	(1)
2014	MO Béjaïa	6	(0)
2015	Vaulx	9	(1)
2015–2016	USM El Harrach	10	(0)
2016–2018	Hauts Lyonnais	0	(0)
2018–2020	Vaulx	5	(0)
- * Club domestic league appearances and goals

Farès Brahimi (born 22 October 1988) is an Algerian footballer who plays as a midfielder.

== Personal life ==
Brahimi was born on 22 October 1988, in Réghaïa, Algiers Province. At age two, he moved with family to France. He has both Algerian and French nationalities.

== Career ==
=== Early career ===
Brahimi emerged through Saint-Étienne's youth system, but made no appearances for the first team during his stint; he played regularly for the reserves, in the Championnat de France amateur. In 2007–08, Farès appeared regularly for US Cognac. In June 2008 he signed a contract with US Feurs.

=== Minyor Pernik ===
Following a trial period in November 2010, Brahimi signed a contract with Bulgarian club Minyor Pernik on 1 February 2011. He made his A Professional Football Group debut on 27 February, as a second-half substitute in a 3–0 home loss against Litex Lovech. Farès quickly became a regular in the starting eleven and scored two goals to the end of the 2010–11 season.

=== Montana ===
On 16 January 2013, Brahimi joined Montana on free transfer for the rest of the season.

=== MO Béjaïa ===
On 10 January 2014, Brahimi joined MO Béjaïa on free transfer for the rest of the season.

== Career statistics ==
(Correct as of January 8, 2013)

Club	Season	League		Cup		Continental		Total	
Club	Season	Apps	Goals	Apps	Goals	Apps	Goals	Apps	Goals
Minyor Pernik	2010–11	14	2	0	0	—	—	14	2
Minyor Pernik	2011–12	28	6	2	0	—	—	30	6
Minyor Pernik	2012–13	15	0	3	1	—	—	18	1
Montana	2012–13	0	0	0	0	—	—	0	0
Total		57	8	5	1	0	0	62	9

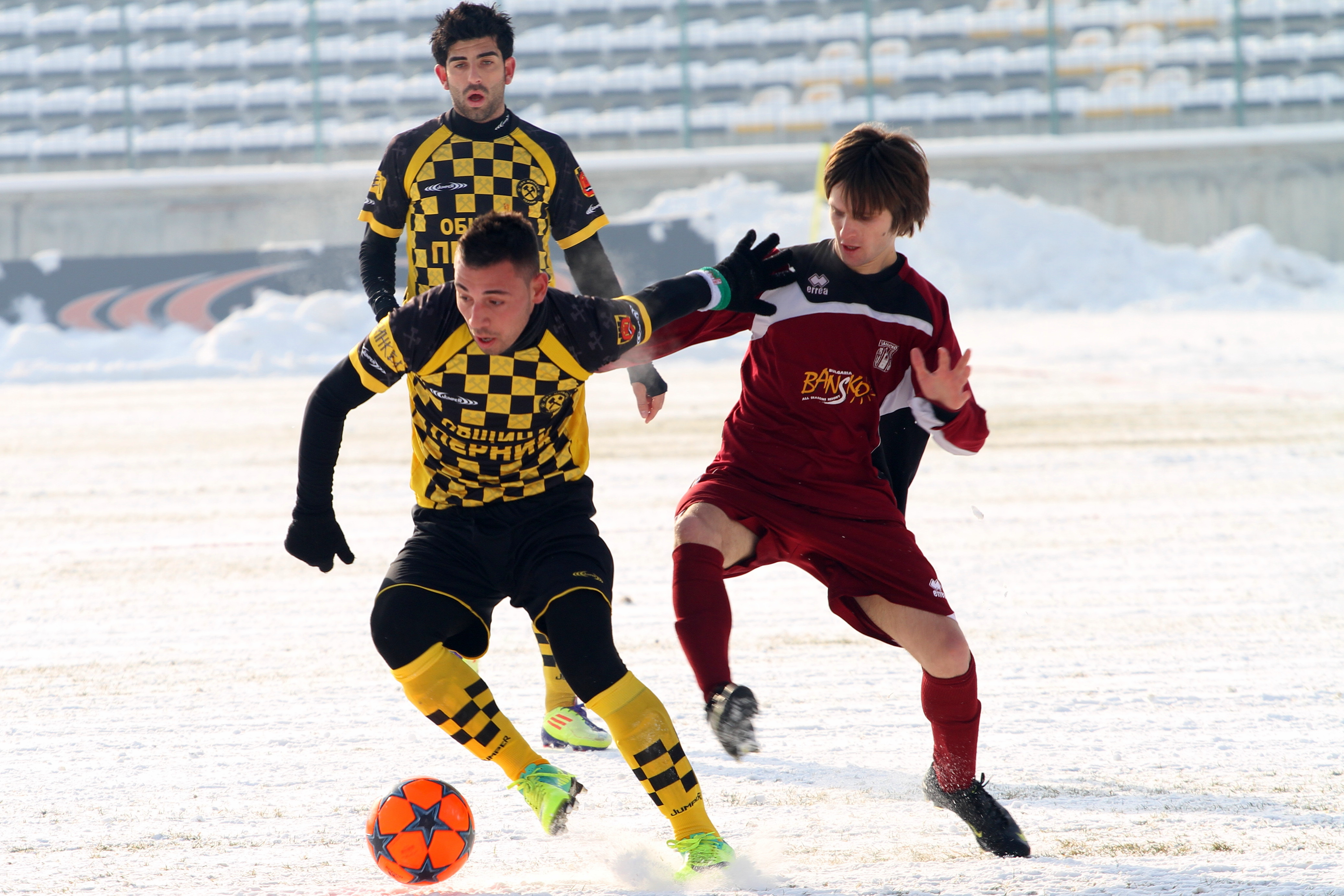
Brahimi during his last match for Minyor against Bansko for Bulgarian Cup, December 15, 2012
