= Inside Mecca =

2003 Islamic film

- DVD cover
- Directed by: Anisa Mehdi
- Release date: 2003

Inside Mecca is a 2003 National Geographic documentary film by Anisa Mehdi that offers an intimate documentation of the annual pilgrimage to Mecca. Aside from providing insight regarding the universal principles of Islam, this production emphasizes the historical significance of Mecca to both the Muslim and non-Muslim population. Often constituting a journey of epic proportions, it follows several pilgrims throughout their trip, and highlight their physical and mental preparation, the strain induced by the journey itself, and the spiritual ecstasy experienced upon arrival. The film is narrated by American voice actor Keith David.

== Home media ==
After the National Geographic Channel broadcast, the documentary was released on DVD and Blu-ray.

== See also ==
- List of Islamic films
