= Mehdi Bashiri =

Iranian scientist (born 1992)

- مهدی بشیری
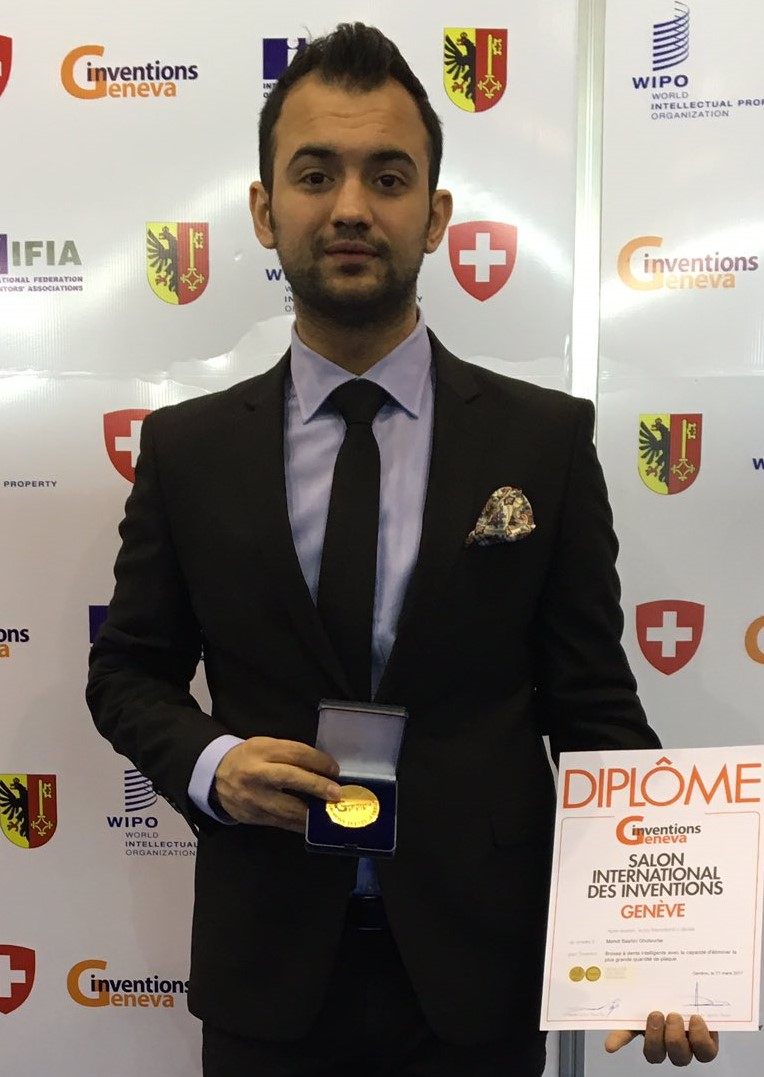
- Born: April 14, 1992 (age 34); Urmia, Iran
- Education: Istanbul Aydin University, Dentistry
- Occupations: Scientist; Inventor; Academic; Writer
- Notable work: One Step to Glory
- Awards: IFIA - International Federation of Inventors Associations Best Invention Medal (2017); Islamic Countries best researcher award (2015); World Intellectual Property Organization Award
- Website: mehdibashiri.com

Mehdi Bashiri (Persian: مهدی بشیری; born April 14, 1992 in Urmia) is an Iranian scientist, inventor, academic, and writer.

== Early life ==
Mehdi was born in Urmia, Iran in 1992. He came to Istanbul for education in 2014. He began his education in dentistry at Istanbul Aydin University. He was the founder of the Istanbul Aydın University Innovation Club and served as the president. He made his first invention the same year and patented it.

In 2015, he was awarded the "Best Researcher Award" by the International Congress on Economic Cooperation Development on Health Focused on Islamic Countries. Bashiri won a gold medal at the 45th International Invention Fair in Geneva, Switzerland. He also received the special prize given by Russia in the same competition. In the INPEX 2017 invention fair held in Pittsburgh, U.S., he was awarded two separate medals of honor. To date, he has won over a hundred medals and awards in fifty-seven countries in the most prestigious competitions in the United States and Europe, 2017, he received the Inventor of the Year Award from the World Innovation Organization. In 2020, he wrote the book One Step to Glory, in which he tells about his life.

== Awards and achievements ==
- IFIA, winner of the best invention gold medal of the year by the Inventors' Organization
- Gold medal in healthcare from the Geneva Invention Contest in Switzerland
- Two medals of honor at the US INPEX competition
- Invention Cup and Gold and Silver Medal of the Year Zagreb Meet up Competition in Croatia
- Honorary Gold Medal of the Indonesian Inventions Organization (INNOPA)
- Two gold medals and one silver medal in healthcare from the South Korea Seoul Patent Competition
- Special gold medal of the Invention Organization of Russia
- Honor Award of the Romanian Inventions Organization
- Silver medal at ISIFA dating competitions in Istanbul
- Honorary gold medal at the Warsaw Polish Inventions Competition
- Bronze medal of the South Korean Inventions Youth Olympiad
- Silver medal of the Kuwait Grand Prize
- Silver medal of the Silicon Valley US Patent Competition
- China Inventors Organization Honorary Gold Medal
- Best researcher award in the field of health in Islamic countries

== Innovations and inventions ==
- Smart toothbrush for the disabled
- Adjustable radiology bed without weight restriction
- Needlestick Prevention Box
- Fully automatic toothbrush
- Smart OPG

== Book ==
- In 2020, he wrote the book One Step to Glory in which he talks about his life.
