= Mehdi Shafaeddin =

Mehdi Shafaeddin (born 12 July 1945) is a Swiss Iranian development economist with a D.Phil. degree from Oxford University. He was affiliated with the University of Neuchatel, Switzerland, until 2011 and previously served as Senior Economist, Executive Direction and Management, United Nations Conference on Trade and Development.

== Publications ==
=== Books ===
- Competitiveness and Development: Myth and Realities (2004)
- Does trade openness favour or hinder industrialization and development (2006)

=== Articles ===
- Policies for industrial learning in China and Mexico
