= Mehdi Mohsenkhah =

Iranian footballer (born 2004)

Personal information
- Full name: ‌‌
- Date of birth: 24 March 2004 (age 22)
- Place of birth: Bandar Abbas, Iran
- Position: Forward

Team information
- Current team: Fulad Hormozgan

Senior career*
Years	Team	Apps	(Gls)
- Shohadaye Hayat Davood Genaveh
- Shahrdari BandarAbbas

International career
- Iran national beach soccer team
- * Club domestic league appearances and goals

Mehdi Mohsenkhah (born 24 March 2004 Bandar Abbas, Hormozgan) is a player of the FuladIHormozgan Team. He plays as a striker.
