= Mehdi Nasiri (journalist) =

Iranian journalist

Mehdi Nasiri مهدی نصیری
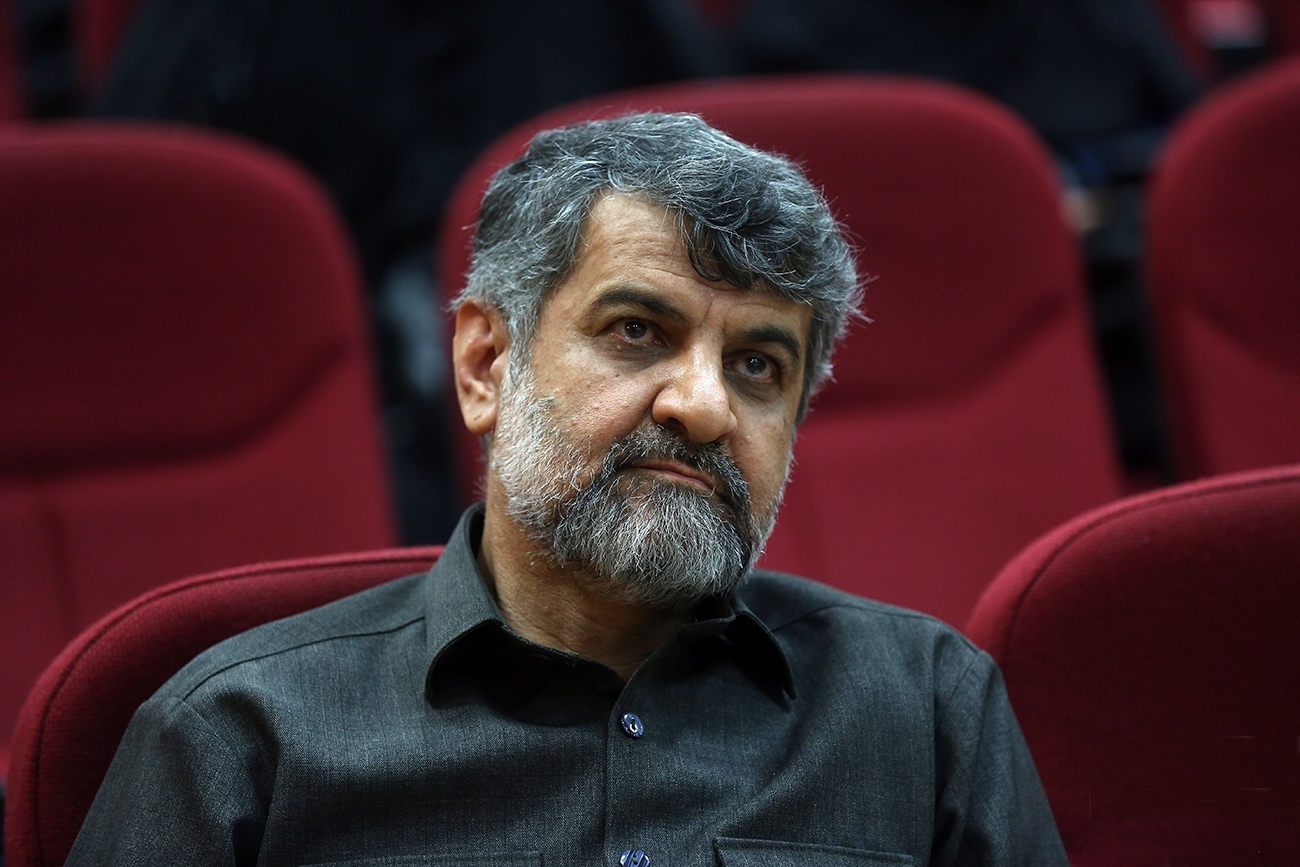
- Born: 1963 (age 62–63); Damghan, Semnan Province, Iran
- Occupations: Writer, journalist

Mehdi Nasiri (Persian: مهدی نصیری; born 1963) is an Iranian journalist and writer, currently serving as the editor-in-chief of the publication Samât (سمات). His career includes previous roles as the editor-in-chief and managing director of the weekly Sobh (صبح) and the daily newspaper Kayhan.

== Early life and education ==
Mehdi Nasiri was born in 1963 in Damghan, a city in Iran. He began his religious studies in 1975 at the Damghan Seminary under the guidance of his father, who had pursued studies at the Najaf Seminary and achieved the rank of Ijtihad. Nasiri continued his education at the Qom Seminary in 1979, delving into advanced courses until 1987. Simultaneously, he taught literature and logic at the Rasalat Seminary.

In 1986, Nasiri initiated his collaboration with the Kayhan Media Institute in Qom, writing numerous articles on political and cultural issues. A year later, he moved to Tehran, continuing his work with the institute as the editor of the editorial service for the Kayhan newspaper. Nasiri contributed extensively to the paper, addressing various political and cultural issues of the time.

In 1988, Nasiri was appointed as the editor-in-chief of Kayhan by Seyed Mohammad Asghari, the interim head of the Kayhan Institute, with the approval of Seyed Mohammad Khatami, the then-representative of Ayatollah Ruhollah Khomeini at the institute. In 1991, following the directive of Ayatollah Ali Khamenei, Nasiri was appointed as the managing director of Kayhan.

However, in 1994, after the appointment of Hossein Shariatmadari as the representative of the Supreme Leader in Kayhan, Nasiri resigned from his positions of managing director and editor-in-chief. During these years, he also attended the external jurisprudence course (Note: External jurisprudence is the highest level of courses in Shia seminaries, and it is in this level that some students succeed in obtaining the level of ijtihad. The stage of teaching external courses in the seminary can be considered the highest scientific level of the seminary. In other words, teachers of external courses in seminaries are called mujtahid.) for two years when the teaching of Khamenei's jurisprudential views began.

In 1995, Nasiri concluded his collaboration with the Kayhan Institute, and in the same year, he launched the political and cultural magazine "Sobh," which continued publication until 1999. In this period, Nasiri engaged in the external jurisprudence and principles of jurisprudence in Qom.

In 2001, he was appointed as the political deputy of the Policy-Making Council of Friday Imams nationwide, serving until 2005. In the same year, Nasiri assumed the position of cultural deputy at the office of the Supreme Leader's representative in the United Arab Emirates, returning to Iran in 2009 upon completing his mission.

== Literary contributions and editorial roles ==
Mehdi Nasiri has made significant contributions to Iranian media and literature. Besides his articles and press discussions, he has authored four books: "Islam and Modernization," "Philosophy from the Perspective of the Quran and Tradition," "The Social Status of Women in Islam," and "Avini and Modernity."

In addition to his role as the editor-in-chief of "Samat," Nasiri manages the publication of the monthly magazine "Tourism Gharb" for the Islamic Republic of Iran Broadcasting's Research Center in Qom. He is also the owner and editor-in-chief of the quarterly magazine "Samat," showcasing his latest achievements in the media industry.

Nasiri's career includes being a member of the jury for the Ammar International Popular Film Festival, demonstrating his commitment to various cultural and artistic endeavors. Through his body of work and dedication, Mehdi Nasiri continues to be a respected figure in Iranian journalism and literature, leaving a lasting impact on the country's intellectual landscape.
