= Mehdi Hacibabayev =

Azerbaijani educator and politician (1871–1925)

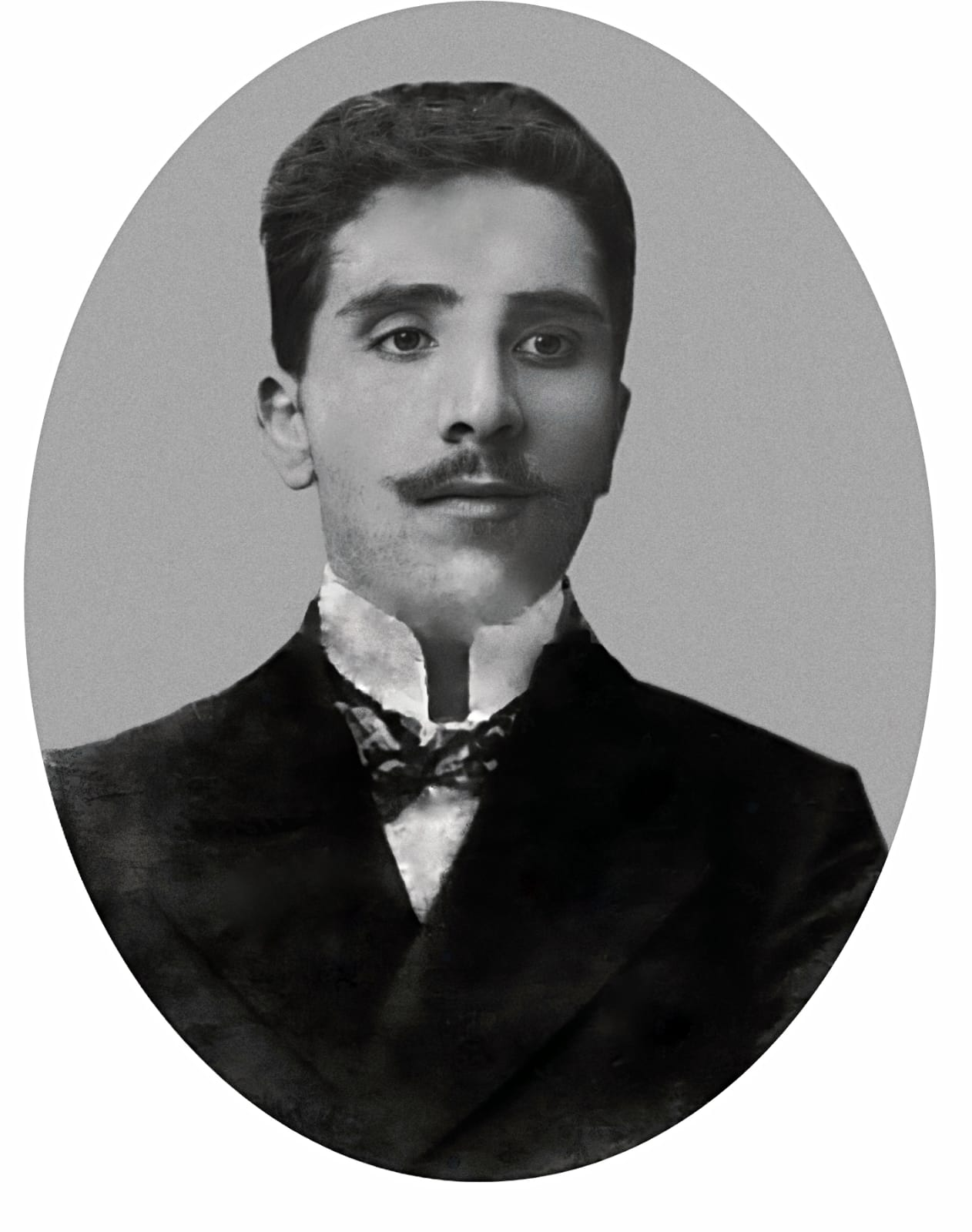
- Born: 1871; Shamakhi, Russian Empire
- Died: 1925 (aged 53–54); Baku, Azerbaijan SSR
- Citizenship: Russian Empire; Republic of Azerbaijan; Soviet Union
- Occupations: Politician and teacher

Mehdi bey Hacibabayev (born 1871, Shamakhi, Russian Empirel died 1925, Baku, Azerbaijan SSR) was a social and political figure, one of the active participants of Azerbaijan's independence struggle.

He was a member of the Hajibababeyov family, along with the famous Azerbaijani architect Gasim bey Hajibababeyov and People's Artiste of the Azerbaijan SSR (1938) Huseynagha Hajibababeyov.

== Life ==
Mehdi Bey Hacibabayev was born in Shamakhi in 1871. He received his education at Baku Realni School. After completing his education, he started working in the field of education. From 1901, he taught at the 1st Baku Russian-Tatar school. He was one of the secretaries of the "Nicat" charity society, taught evening courses, headed the theater department of the "Nicat" society, and at the same time was elected the director of the 1st city Russian-Tatar school of the "Nicat" society.

Hacibabayev began to engage in politics and became a member of the Transcaucasian Seim. When the Transcaucasian Democratic Federative Republic collapsed, he was one of the 26 people who signed the Declaration of Independence of Azerbaijan as a member of the National Council of Azerbaijan. He was a member of the Parliament of the Azerbaijan Democratic Republic and the Musavat faction (later "Musavat" and the neutral faction).

He died in 1925.

== Sources ==
- Azərbaycan Xalq Cümhuriyyəti Ensiklopediyası (2005). Mehdi bəy Hacıbababəyov. Baku: Şərq-Qərb..
- Əsədov, Oqtay; Cəbrayılov, Rauf (2008). Azərbaycan Respublikasının Parlamenti. Bakı: Çaşıoğlu.
- Əmrahov, Ziyad (2018). Azərbaycan Parlamentarizmi tarixi – 100. Bakı: Elm və təhsil.
- Qasımlı, Musa; Muradova, Bahar; Qafarov, Vaqif (2018). Azərbaycan parlamentarizmi tarixi. 2 volumes. Bakı: Mütərcim.
- Yaqublu, Nəsiman (2018). Cümhuriyyət qurucuları. Bakı: Nurlar NPM.
