= Mehdi Dagher =

Iranian football player

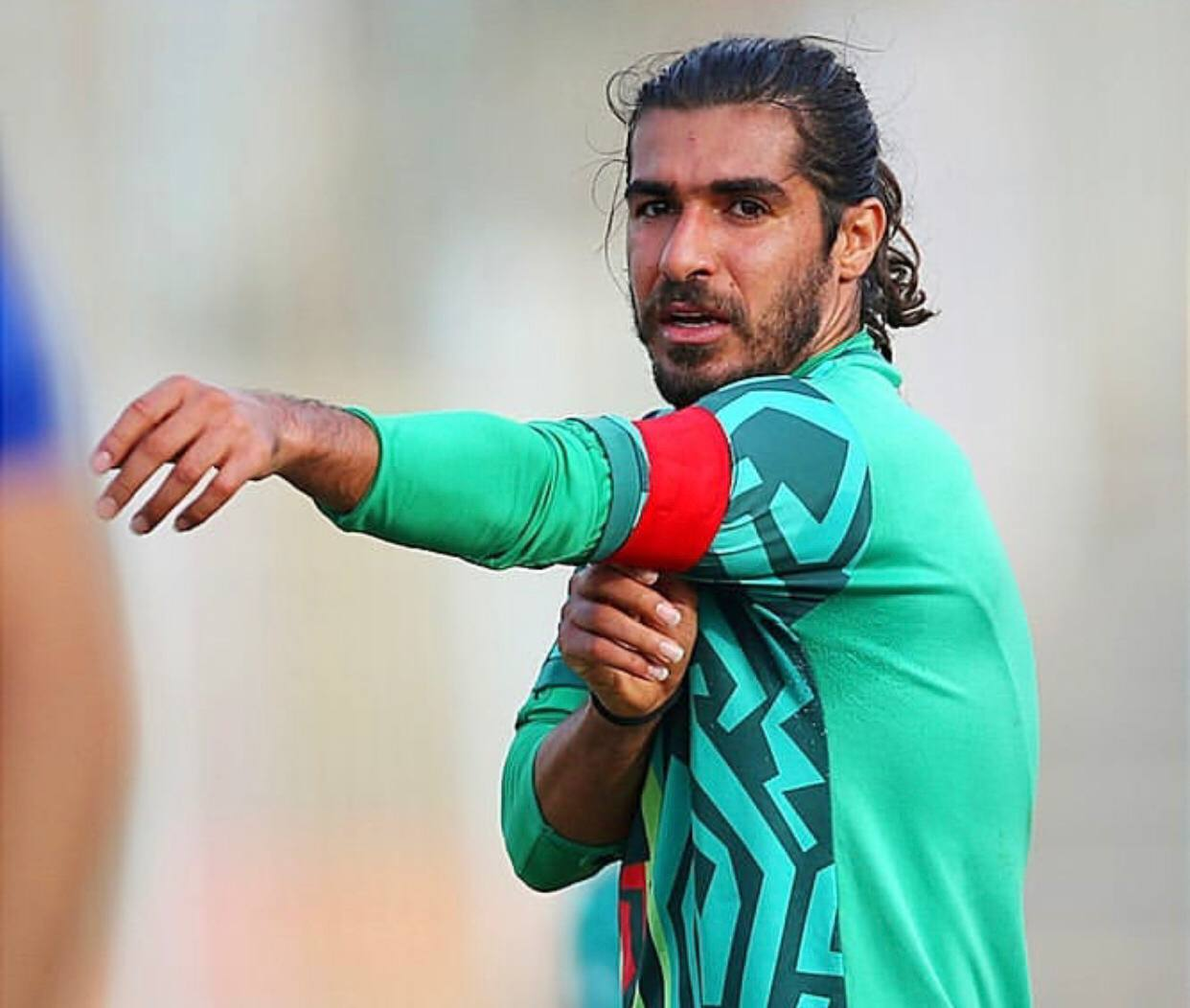
- Mehdi in 2021

Personal information
- Full name: Mehdi Dagher
- Date of birth: 6 August 1990 (age 36)
- Place of birth: Susangerd, Iran
- Height: 1.82 m (6 ft 0 in)
- Position: Defensive midfielder

Team information
- Current team: Damash Gilan
- Number: 66

Youth career
- 2004–2005: Shahin Susangerd
- 2005–2009: Esteghlal Ahvaz

Senior career*
| Years | Team | Apps | (Gls) |
| 2009–2011 | Esteghlal Ahvaz | 52 | (4) |
| 2011–2013 | Naft Omidiyeh | 85 | (2) |
| 2013–2014 | Shahin Natanz | 29 | (0) |
| 2014–2015 | Petrokian Shoushtar | 33 | (1) |
| 2015–2017 | Shahin Mahshahr | 25 | (0) |
| 2017–2018 | Naft Omidiyeh | 27 | (3) |
| 2018–2019 | Shahardari Bam | 23 | (0) |
| 2019–2021 | Qashqai | 50 | (5) |
| 2021–2022 | Esteghlal Mollasani | 18 | (0) |
| 2022–2023 | Khalij Fars Mahshahr | 19 | (0) |
| 2023–2024 | Sanat Naft Abadan | 11 | (0) |
| 2024 | Kavir Moghava | 8 | (0) |
| 2025 | Be'sat | 13 | (0) |
| 2025– | Damash Gilan | 0 | (0) |
- * Club domestic league appearances and goals

Mehdi Dagher (Persian: مهدی داغر; born 6 August 1990) is an Iranian football player who plays as a defensive midfielder for Damash Gilan in the Azadegan League.

In 2023, he joined Sanat Naft Abadan F.C. and entered the Persian Gulf Pro League.

== Honors ==
Shahin Mahshahr

- Promotion to League 2: 2015–16

Kavir Moghava

- Promotion to Azadegan League: 2024
