= Mehdi Azizian =

Iranian businessman and economist

- Born: January 20, 1956 (age 70); Mashhad, Iran
- Occupation: Businessman
- Title: former President and CEO of Astan Quds Razavi

Mehdi Azizian (Persian: مهدی عزیزیان, born 20 January 1956) is an Iranian businessman and economist who was President and CEO of Astan Quds Razavi (AQR) from 1 March 2014 until 29 March 2016. He was previously Economic Vice President of the company.

== Career ==
Mehdi Azizian, a civil engineer, is head of the Astan Quds Razavi (AQR) since 1988. He is also chairman of the Organization for Eghtesade Razavi, the largest financial holding company, the country's biggest in eastern part. AQR is one of the largest charitable foundation in Iran, "with huge holdings acquired through generations of donations" from devotees at the Imam Reza shrine and has revenues in billions of dollars. After the revolution, Azizian was in charge of the huge construction project which expanded the Imam Reza shrine. He also had a lot of input into the overall urban planning around the shrine, the architecture of the new elements (porches, porticoes, courts etc.) in the shrine of Imam Reza.
