= Mehdi Ben Mrad =

Tunisian footballer (born 1998)

Personal information
- Date of birth: 6 June 1998 (age 28)
- Position: Goalkeeper

Team information
- Current team: Stade Tunisien

Senior career*
Years	Team	Apps	(Gls)
2019–	Stade Tunisien	6	(0)
2020	→ AS Oued Ellil (loan)		
2020–2021	→ EO Sidi Bouzid (loan)		
- * Club domestic league appearances and goals as of 18:04, 9 October 2022 (UTC)

Mehdi Ben Mrad (Arabic: مهدي بن مراد; born 6 June 1998) is a Tunisian footballer who plays as a goalkeeper for Stade Tunisien.

== Club career ==
Following an injury to Kaïs Amdouni, Ben Mrad was named first choice goalkeeper in his absence, standing in for eight games in the 2018–19 season.

In September 2020, Ben Mrad moved to AS Oued Ellil on loan. However, in October of the same year, he was loaned to EO Sidi Bouzid.

He returned to the Stade Tunisien first team ahead of the 2022–23 season.

== Career statistics ==
=== Club ===
As of 9 October 2022.

Club	Season	League			Cup		Continental		Other		Total	
Club	Season	Division	Apps	Goals	Apps	Goals	Apps	Goals	Apps	Goals	Apps	Goals
Stade Tunisien	2018–19	CLP-1	6	0	2 (Note: Appearances in the Tunisian Cup)	0	0	0	0	0	8	0
Stade Tunisien	2019–20	CLP-1	0	0	0	0	0	0	0	0	0	0
Career total			6	0	2	0	0	0	0	0	8	0
