= Medhi =

Village in Maharashtra

- village
- Location in Maharashtra, India Medhi (India)
- Coordinates: 19.8702316°N 73.0818468°E
- Country: India
- State: Maharashtra
- District: Palghar
- Taluka: Vikramgad
- Elevation: 100 m (330 ft)

Population (2011)
  - Total: 1,094
- Time zone: UTC+5:30 (IST)
- 2011 census code: 551769

Medhi is a village in the Palghar district of Maharashtra, India. It is located in the Vikramgad taluka.

== Demographics ==
According to the 2011 census of India, Medhi has 218 households. The effective literacy rate (i.e. the literacy rate of population excluding children aged 6 and below) is 63.34%.

Demographics (2011 Census)
	Total	Male	Female
Population	1094	536	558
Children aged below 6 years	191	92	99
Scheduled caste	0	0	0
Scheduled tribe	1093	536	557
Literates	572	322	250
Workers (all)	646	321	325
Main workers (total)	639	316	323
Main workers: Cultivators	163	74	89
Main workers: Agricultural labourers	437	220	217
Main workers: Household industry workers	2	2	0
Main workers: Other	37	20	17
Marginal workers (total)	7	5	2
Marginal workers: Cultivators	2	1	1
Marginal workers: Agricultural labourers	0	0	0
Marginal workers: Household industry workers	0	0	0
Marginal workers: Others	5	4	1
Non-workers	448	215	233
