= Mehdi Sojoudi Moghaddam =

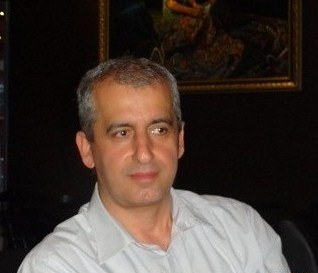
- Sojoudi in 2015
- Born: January 15, 1962 (age 63); Tehran, Iran
- Education: University of Tehran
- Occupations: Poet; writer; translator
- Notable work: An Eye for an Eye (2012)

Mehdi Sojoudi Moghaddam (born January 15, 1962) is an Iranian writer, literary translator and scholar.

== Biography ==
Born in Tehran, Sojoudi grew up in an educated family and attended Hadaf High School, one of the best schools in town where he started his literary activities by writings short stories and poetry.

In 1988, he matriculated into the University of Tehran and received his BA in English language and literature.

== Career ==
Sojoudi is the writer of "An Eye for an Eye" (2012) in which he details the ordeal of Ameneh Bahrami who was blinded and disfigured by her lover who threw acid to her face. Ameneh's tragedy made headlines all across the world as she made relentless efforts to have acid injected into the eyes of her attacker Majid Movahedi as retribution. As officials were counting down, she decided to pardon him. "I couldn't do it, I knew I could not live with it until the end of my life," she said. "I knew I would have suffered and burned twice had I done that.”

In an interview with Mehr News Agency, Sojoudi praised Ameneh and said, "Ameneh is very intelligent and capable and is in many respects superior to those who can see; she uses words which are uniquely hers. She never holds a white stick and when she enters a room she says: Wow, what a beautiful room.”

Sojoudi has translated a number of novels into Persian including The Notebook by Nicholas Sparks, The Reader (Der Vorleser) by Bernhard Schlink, Wuthering Heights by Emily Brontë, Love Comes Softly by Janette Oke, Lily of the Valley by Honoré de Balzac and Laughter in the Dark by Vladimir Nabokov. He has also collaborated with Iranian scholar Ali Salami to translate various works by Shakespeare into Persian.

Sojoudi is currently working on his first novel.
