= M. T. Mehdi =

Arab-American activist

- Born: 6 January 1928; Karbala, British Mandate of Mesopotamia (present-day Iraq)
- Died: 23 February 1998 (aged 70); Manhattan, New York, U.S.
- Occupations: Writer, activist
- Children: 3 (including Anisa Mehdi)

Mohammed (or Mohammad) Taki Mehdi, commonly M. T. Mehdi (January 6, 1928 - February 23, 1998) was an Arab-American based in New York, was one of the earliest pro-Palestinian activists in the United States, and firm in his defense of the Palestinian cause. He held debates on television and radio with many supporters of Israel, including the rabbi Meir Kahane. He said Sirhan acted justifiably in his assassination of Robert F. Kennedy. He died of cardiac arrest at Bellevue Hospital in 1998.

== Life ==
M. T. Mehdi was born in Karbala, Iraq (then in the British Mandate of Mesopotamia) in 1928. He was the second son born to El Hajj Abdullah Mehdi, the proprietor of a coffee shop in Karbala. He came to the United States to study at the University of California at Berkeley and achieved a doctorate in political science. He sued, successfully, the New York City Board of Education, requiring it to display Islamic crescents along with Christian and Jewish symbols during the holiday season. Out of his three daughters, Anisa Mehdi is a documentary filmmaker.

M. T. Mehdi founded the Action Committee on American-Arab Relations, and interviewed Sirhan Sirhan several times during Sirhan's imprisonment, at which time Mehdi was the president of the American-Arab Relations Committee.

M. T. Mehdi was a leading pro-Palestinian activist in the United States, and openly supported the Palestine Liberation Organization. He was criticized by the Jewish Journal for his support of Sirhan, a Palestinian, for Mehdi's numerous interviews with him, as well as his belief that Sirhan acted justifiably in the assassination of Robert Kennedy. He wrote a 100-page book entitled "Kennedy and Sirhan: Why?", and had said that he believed Sirhan had acted in justifiable self-defense, stating: "Sirhan was defending himself against those 50 Phantom jets Kennedy was sending to Israel."

After the 1993 World Trade Center bombing, he gave counsel to the blind sheikh Omar Abdel-Rahman, who was later convicted and given a life sentence for his role in the attacks.

He has also been criticized for his denouncing of Yasser Arafat, especially by those within the Muslim organizations. Regarding Arafat's red-carpet welcome from President Bill Clinton, M. T. Mehdi, then-president of the American Arab and Muslim Council, denounced Arafat as "... a pawn in the reelection bids of both Clinton and Israeli Prime Minister Shimon Peres...", who visited the White House on April 30, 1996. "He is being as well-received as Peres because he is doing what Peres wants him to do," said Mehdi. "It's a charade."

== Publications ==
- Constitutionalism: Western and Middle Eastern (1960)
- The Question of Palestine (1961)
- Of Lions, Chained: An Arab Looks at America (1962)
- Kennedy and Sirhan: Why? (1968)
- Peace in Palestine (1976)
- Terrorism: Why America Is the Target! (1988)
