= Mehdi Mollapour =

British-American biochemist (born 1973)

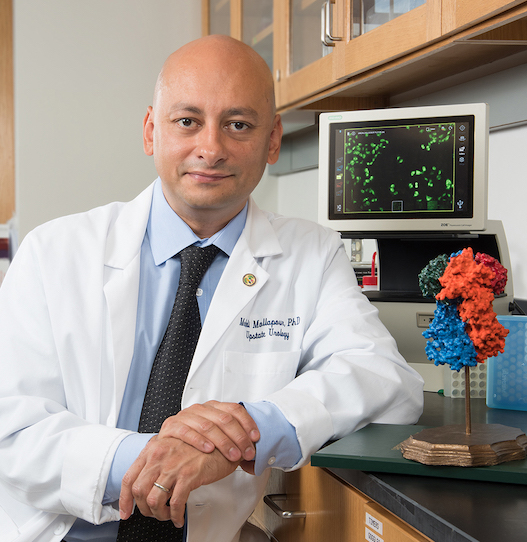
- Born: 1973 (age 52–53)
- Education: London School of Hygiene & Tropical Medicine, University College London
- Known for: Renal cancer research, Hsp90
- Scientific career
- Fields: Urology, Biochemistry
- Workplaces: SUNY Upstate Medical University, National Cancer Institute, University of Sheffield

Mehdi Mollapour (born 1973) is a British-American biochemist and cancer biologist. He is a professor, vice chair for translational research and director of Renal Cancer Biology Program for the Department of Urology, and adjunct professor at the Department of Biochemistry and Molecular Biology at SUNY Upstate Medical University.

== Education ==
Mollapour holds a BSc (Hons) in microbiology and biochemistry from the University of East London, MSc in applied molecular biology of infectious diseases and diploma in tropical medicine and infectious diseases from the London School of Hygiene & Tropical Medicine. In 2001 he received his PhD in Biochemistry from the University College London.

== Academic career ==
Mollapour completed his postdoctoral research at the University of Sheffield and in 2006 he received the Federation of European Societies (FEBS) fellowship.

He joined the laboratory of Dr Len Neckers in Urological Oncology Branch, (Chief Dr. W. Marston Linehan), at the National Cancer Institute as a research fellow in 2007.

In 2013 he joined the Department of Urology at the Upstate Medical University as an assistant professor. He became the Director of the Kidney Cancer Program within the same department in 2015.

In 2018 he became the Professor of Urology and Adjunct Professor of Biochemistry and Molecular Biology at SUNY Upstate Medical University. He was also named the Vice Chair for Translational Research for the Department of Urology in the same year. Mollapour was elected president of the Cell Stress Society International in 2023 and began his term in 2025. Mollapour's h-index is 52, based on almost 10,000 citations.

== Research ==
=== Molecular Chaperones ===
Mollapour is widely recognized for his research on post-translation regulation of the molecular chaperone Heat shock protein-90 (Hsp90) and co-chaperones in cancer. His work demonstrated how reversible biochemical reactions can become directional and ordered, and in general, how a house-keeping machine (Hsp90) can be modulated through signaling inputs and consequently regulating many cellular pathways such cell cycle, steroid hormone receptor and autophagy.

Mollapour's finding on canonical and non-canonical post-translational modifications of the Hsp90 chaperone machinery has also explained the reasons for tumors sensitivity and selectivity towards the Hsp90 inhibitors.

=== Tuberous Sclerosis Complex and Birt–Hogg–Dubé syndrome (BHD) ===
Mollapour's laboratory has discovered the tumor suppressor TSC1 and FNIPs function as the new co-chaperones of Hsp90. These two proteins are involved in Tuberous Sclerosis Complex and Birt–Hogg–Dubé syndrome (BHD) syndromes respectively. His research has identified a cross-talk between these two co-chaperones and demonstrated interconnectivity and compensatory mechanisms between the BHD and TSC pathways.

=== Kidney Cancer ===
Mutations and loss of function of the Von Hippel-Lindau (VHL) tumor suppressor gene play a causal role in the pathogenesis of clear cell renal carcinomas (ccRCC), a pathological subtype that accounts for the majority kidney cancer each year. Mollapour work has shown that VHL ubiquitinates protein phosphatase-5 (PP5) for proteasomal degradation in a hypoxia- and prolyl-hydroxylation-independent manner. VHL-deficient ccRCC cell lines and patient tumors exhibit elevated PP5 levels. Downregulation of PP5 causes activation of the extrinsic apoptotic pathway in ccRCC cells, suggesting a prosurvival role for PP5 in kidney cancer cells, regulated by phosphorylation and ubiquitination. Building on this foundation, Mollapour's team developed a selective PP5 inhibitor, demonstrating its ability to activate the extrinsic apoptotic pathway in kidney cancer cells by disrupting complex II. These findings not only elucidate the molecular mechanisms underlying kidney cancer progression but also present potential new therapeutic strategies for treatment.

Mollapour's research group has been supported by grants from the National Institutes for General Medical Science and the National Cancer Institute and US Department of Veterans Affairs to design and examine novel therapeutic strategies for patients with kidney, bladder and breast cancer.

=== Metabolism and the Warburg Effect ===
Aerobic glycolysis in cancer cells, also known as the "Warburg effect", is driven by hyperactivity of lactate dehydrogenase-A (LDHA). Mollapour's team has identified the human tumor suppressor folliculin (FLCN) as a binding partner and uncompetitive inhibitor of LDHA. Their work has provided a new paradigm for the regulation of glycolysis. Cancer cells that experience the Warburg effect show FLCN dissociation from LDHA. Mollapour's lab has shown that treatment of these cancer cells with a decapeptide derived from the FLCN loop region caused cell death, therefore providing a new avenue for targeted therapy in these cancers.

=== Kidney Cancer Patient Advocacy ===
Mollapour is actively involved in kidney cancer patient advocacy. He serves on the scientific advisory panel for KidneyCAN, a patient-created and patient-driven movement dedicated to accelerating cures for kidney cancer. Mollapour's commitment to rare kidney cancer research is further exemplified by his membership on the Birt-Hogg-Dubé (BHD) Science Advisory Board. This board is part of the Myrovlytis Trust, a UK charity founded in 2007 to promote research into rare conditions and advance public education in medical and molecular genetics.

== Recognition ==
- 2025 President Cell Stress Society International
- 2024 Outstanding Contributor to the Kidney Cancer Field - Mount Sinai Hospital, NY
- 2023 President-elect Cell Stress Society International
- 2019 Fellow of Cell Stress Society International
- 2017 Society for Basic Urological Research Young Investigator
- 2017 American Urological Association Research Scholar
- 2013 Early Career Award, Cell Stress Society International
- 2011 2011 Lasker~Bloomberg Public Service Award, as member of the recipient team at The Clinical Center of the National Institutes of Health
- 2010 Intramural National Cancer Institute (NCI) Fellow and Young Investigator of the Year
- 2010 Scholar-in-training award, American Association for Cancer Research (AACR)
- 2006 Federation of European Biochemical Societies Research Fellowship (FEBS)

== Selected publications ==
- Sager, RA; Woodford, MR; Backe, SJ; Makedon, AM; Baker-Williams, AJ; DiGregorio, BT; Loiselle, DR; Haystead, TA; Zachara, NE; Prodromou, C; Bourboulia, D; Schmidt, LS; Linehan, WM; Bratslavsky, G; Mollapour, M (2019). "Post-translational Regulation of FNIP1 Creates a Rheostat for the Molecular Chaperone Hsp90". Cell Rep. 26: 1344–1356.e5. doi:10.1016/j.celrep.2019.01.018. PMC 6370319. PMID 30699359..
- Woodford, MR; Hughes, M; Sager, RA; Backe, SJ; Baker-Williams, AJ; Bratslavsky, MS; Jacob, JM; Shapiro, O; Wong, M; Bratslavsky, G; Bourboulia, D; Mollapour, M (2019). "Mutation of the co-chaperone Tsc1 in bladder cancer diminishes Hsp90 acetylation and reduces drug sensitivity and selectivity". Oncotarget. 10: 5824–5834. doi:10.18632/oncotarget.27217. PMC 6791385. PMID 31645902..
- Sager, RA; Woodford, MR; Mollapour, M (2018). "The mTOR Independent Function of Tsc1 and FNIPs". Trends Biochem Sci. 43: 935–937. doi:10.1016/j.tibs.2018.09.018. PMC 6324182. PMID 30361061..
- Sager, RA; Woodford, MR; Neckers, L; Mollapour, M (2018). "Detecting Posttranslational Modifications of Hsp90". Methods Mol Biol. 1709: 209–219. doi:10.1007/978-1-4939-7477-1_16. PMC 6376113. PMID 29177662..
- Sager, RA; Woodford, MR; Shapiro, O; Mollapour, M; Bratslavsky, G (2018). "Sporadic renal angiomyolipoma in a patient with Birt-Hogg-Dubé: chaperones in pathogenesis". Oncotarget. 9: 22220–22229. doi:10.18632/oncotarget.25164. PMC 5955167. PMID 29774133..
- Woodford, MR; Sager, RA; Marris, E; Dunn, DM; Blanden, AR; Murphy, RL; Rensing, N; Shapiro, O; Panaretou, B; Prodromou, C; Loh, SN; Gutmann, DH; Bourboulia, D; Bratslavsky, G; Wong, M; Mollapour, M (2017). "Tumor suppressor Tsc1 is a new Hsp90 co-chaperone that facilitates folding of kinase and non-kinase clients". EMBO J. 36: 3650–3665. doi:10.15252/embj.201796700. PMC 5730846. PMID 29127155..
- Dushukyan, N; Dunn, DM; Sager, RA; Woodford, MR; Loiselle, DR; Daneshvar, M; Baker-Williams, AJ; Chisholm, JD; Truman, AW; Vaughan, CK; Haystead, TA; Bratslavsky, G; Bourboulia, D; Mollapour, M (2017). "Phosphorylation and Ubiquitination Regulate Protein Phosphatase 5 Activity and Its Prosurvival Role in Kidney Cancer". Cell Rep. 21: 1883–1895. doi:10.1016/j.celrep.2017.10.074. PMC 5699234. PMID 29141220..
- Bratslavsky, G; Woodford, MR; Daneshvar, M; Mollapour, M (2016). "Sixth BHD Symposium and First International Upstate Kidney Cancer Symposium: latest scientific and clinical discoveries". Oncotarget. 7: 15292–8. doi:10.18632/oncotarget.7733. PMC 4941241. PMID 26933819..
- Woodford, MR; Dunn, D; Miller, JB; Jamal, S; Neckers, L; Mollapour, M (2016). "Impact of Posttranslational Modifications on the Anticancer Activity of Hsp90 Inhibitors". Adv Cancer Res. 129: 31–50. doi:10.1016/bs.acr.2015.09.002. PMID 26916000..
- Woodford, MR; Dunn, DM; Blanden, AR; Capriotti, D; Loiselle, D; Prodromou, C; Panaretou, B; Hughes, PF; Smith, A; Ackerman, W; Haystead, TA; Loh, SN; Bourboulia, D; Schmidt, LS; Marston Linehan, W; Bratslavsky, G; Mollapour, M (2016). "The FNIP co-chaperones decelerate the Hsp90 chaperone cycle and enhance drug binding". Nat Commun. 7 12037. Bibcode:2016NatCo...712037W. doi:10.1038/ncomms12037. PMC 4931344. PMID 27353360..
- Woodford, MR; Dunn, DM; Ciciarelli, JG; Beebe, K; Neckers, L; Mollapour, M (2016). "Targeting Hsp90 in Non-Cancerous Maladies". Curr Top Med Chem. 16: 2792–804. doi:10.2174/1568026616666160413141753. PMID 27072697..
- Woodford, MR; Truman, AW; Dunn, DM; Jensen, SM; Cotran, R; Bullard, R; Abouelleil, M; Beebe, K; Wolfgeher, D; Wierzbicki, S; Post, DE; Caza, T; Tsutsumi, S; Panaretou, B; Kron, SJ; Trepel, JB; Landas, S; Prodromou, C; Shapiro, O; Stetler-Stevenson, WG; Bourboulia, D; Neckers, L; Bratslavsky, G; Mollapour, M (2016). "Mps1 Mediated Phosphorylation of Hsp90 Confers Renal Cell Carcinoma Sensitivity and Selectivity to Hsp90 Inhibitors". Cell Rep. 14: 872–884. doi:10.1016/j.celrep.2015.12.084. PMC 4887101. PMID 26804907..
- Dunn, DM; Woodford, MR; Truman, AW; Jensen, SM; Schulman, J; Caza, T; Remillard, TC; Loiselle, D; Wolfgeher, D; Blagg, BS; Franco, L; Haystead, TA; Daturpalli, S; Mayer, MP; Trepel, JB; Morgan, RM; Prodromou, C; Kron, SJ; Panaretou, B; Stetler-Stevenson, WG; Landas, SK; Neckers, L; Bratslavsky, G; Bourboulia, D; Mollapour, M (2015). "c-Abl Mediated Tyrosine Phosphorylation of Aha1 Activates Its Co-chaperone Function in Cancer Cells". Cell Rep. 12: 1006–18. doi:10.1016/j.celrep.2015.07.004. PMC 4778718. PMID 26235616..
- Mollapour, M; Bourboulia, D; Beebe, K; Woodford, MR; Polier, S; Hoang, A; Chelluri, R; Li, Y; Guo, A; Lee, MJ; Fotooh-Abadi, E; Khan, S; Prince, T; Miyajima, N; Yoshida, S; Tsutsumi, S; Xu, W; Panaretou, B; Stetler-Stevenson, WG; Bratslavsky, G; Trepel, JB; Prodromou, C; Neckers, L (2014). "Asymmetric Hsp90 N domain SUMOylation recruits Aha1 and ATP-competitive inhibitors". Mol Cell. 53: 317–29. doi:10.1016/j.molcel.2013.12.007. PMC 3964875. PMID 24462205..
