= Mehdi Zoubairi =

Moroccan footballer

Personal information
- Date of birth: April 21, 1987 (age 39)
- Place of birth: Marrakesh, Morocco
- Position: Defender

Team information
- Current team: Kawkab Marrakech

Youth career
- ?–2006: Kawkab Marrakech

Senior career*
Years	Team	Apps	(Gls)
2006–	Kawkab Marrakech	70	(0)

International career^{‡}
2008–	Morocco U-23		
- * Club domestic league appearances and goals as of 03:27, 3 June 2009 (UTC) ‡ National team caps and goals as of October 17, 2008

Mehdi Zoubairi is a Moroccan footballer. He plays as a defender for Kawkab Marrakech.

Zoubairi was selected for the Morocco national under-23 football team which participated in qualifying for the 2008 Summer Olympics.
