= Mehdi Sajjadi =

Iranian footballer

Personal information
- Full name: Seyyed Mehdi Sajjadi
- Date of birth: 17 October 1999 (age 27)
- Place of birth: Arak, Iran
- Position: Forward

Team information
- Current team: Khooshe Talaee
- Number: 28

Youth career
- Aluminium Arak

Senior career*
Years	Team	Apps	(Gls)
2019–2022	Aluminium Arak	7	(0)
2022–2023	Fajr Sepasi Shiraz	1	(1)
2023–	Khooshe Talaee	6	(0)
- * Club domestic league appearances and goals as of 10 June 2024

Seyyed Mehdi Sajjadi (Persian: سید مهدی سجادی; born 17 October 1999) is an Iranian footballer who plays as a forward for Khooshe Talaee.
