= Mehdi Hassan =

Pakistani ghazal singer (1927–2012)

Shahenshah-e-Ghazal Ustad Mehdi Hassan Khan NI HI TI PP
- مہدی حسن خان
- Hassan in 1980
- Born: 18 July 1927; Luna, Jaipur State, British India
- Died: 13 June 2012 (aged 84); Karachi, Sindh, Pakistan
- Occupations: Singer; Music composer
- Years active: 1957–1999
- Children: 14, including Asif Mehdi
- Awards: Pride of Performance (1985); Nigar Awards for Best Male Playback Singer
- Honours: Nishan-e-Imtiaz (2006); Hilal-e-Imtiaz (2010); Tamgha-e-Imtiaz (2004)
- Musical career
- Genre: Ghazal
- Instruments: Vocals; Harmonium; Jal tarang
- Labels: PTV; Radio Pakistan
- Website: mehdihassan.com

Mehdi Hassan Khan NI PP TI HI (Urdu: مہدی حسن خاں; 18 July 1927 – 13 June 2012), known as Mehdi Hassan, was a Pakistani ghazal singer and playback singer of great renown. Known as Shahenshah-e-Ghazal (شہنشاہِ غزل, "Emperor of Ghazal"), he is widely regarded as one of the greatest and most influential figures in the history of ghazal singing. Known for his "haunting" baritone voice, Hassan is credited with bringing ghazal singing to a worldwide audience. He is unique for his melodic patterns and maintaining integrity of the ragas in an innovative way.

Born into a family of Kalawant musicians, Hassan was naturally inclined towards music from a young age. He influenced generations of singers from diverse genres, from Jagjit Singh to Parvez Mehdi. He earned numerous awards and accolades during his lifetime and remained a leading singer of Pakistani film industry, along with contemporary playback singer Ahmed Rushdi; it is estimated that Hassan sang for over 300 films during his career. For his contributions to the arts, Hassan was awarded the Nishan-e-Imtiaz, Tamgha-e-Imtiaz, Pride of Performance, and the Hilal-e-Imtiaz by the Government of Pakistan.

== Early life ==
Hassan was born on 18 July 1927 into a mixed Pathan-Mughal family in the village of Luna, then located in the Jaipur State of the Rajputana Agency in British India but now in the Indian state of Rajasthan, into a family of traditional musicians. He claims to be the 16th generation of hereditary musicians hailing from the Kalawant clan of musicians who have been ustads and teachers to royal families, including the kings of Nepal. Hassan started singing at the age of 4-5 and writing lyrics and composing music at the age of 6 but began his formal musical training in Hindustani classical music at the age of 8, completing it with his father Ustad Azeem Khan and uncle Ustad Ismail Khan who were both traditional dhrupad singers. Hassan started performing at a young age, his first professional performance being before the Maharaja of Baroda at the age of 8; by the time he was 18 years old, Hassan is said to have mastered the classical singing forms of dhrupad, dadra, thumri, and khayal, and started performing at royal courts with his brother Ghulam Qadir. Hassan started his career primarily as a thumri exponent. His first concert of dhrupad and khayal with his elder brother is reported to have been held in Fazilka Bungla, near present DC House (1935) of undivided Punjab. His elder brother Pandit Ghulam Qadir also was instrumental in sharpening his skills. Instruments he would master include the harmonium as well the jal tarang.

Hassan credited his aristocratic upbringing and early training with instilling discipline and physical stamina that shaped his musical career. He stated that, despite not completing formal education due to the demands of music, his daily routine involved rigorous physical exercise, religious observance, and extended hours of vocal practice. Hassan recalled that his father emphasized physical fitness and discipline as essential to becoming a successful singer, and he attributed this regimen to his ability to sing continuously for up to 52 hours without experiencing breathlessness.

After the partition of India in 1947, the 20-year-old Hassan and his family migrated to Pakistan, carrying little with them by way of material belongings. The family proceeded to his paternal aunt's house who lived in a village, Chak No 111/7R, near Chichawatni. They suffered severe financial hardships in their new country. Hassan initially started working in the nearby city of Chichawatni, in a bicycle shop, Mughal Cycle House, and later became a car and diesel tractor mechanic. Despite the financial hardships, he kept up his singing practice on a daily basis.

== Singing career ==
In 1957, Hassan was again given the opportunity to sing on Radio Pakistan, primarily as a thumri singer and later as a ghazal performer, which earned him recognition within the musical fraternity. He had a passion for Urdu poetry, and therefore, he began to experiment by singing ghazals on a part-time basis. He cites radio officers Z.A. Bukhari and Rafiq Anwar as additional influences in his progression as a ghazal singer. He first sang on Radio Pakistan in 1952. His first film song was "Nazar Milte Hi Dil Ki Bat Ka Charcha Na Ho Jaye" for the film Shikhar (1956). This song was written by poet Yazdani Jalandhari and its music was composed by Asghar Ali M. Husain. However, his true breakthrough in Pakistani film industry came in 1964, with his ghazal "Gulon mein rang bharay, baad-e-naubahar chale" from the film Farangi. Written by renowned Pakistani poet Faiz Ahmed Faiz and composed by Rasheed Attre, so immense was the popularity of Hassan's rendition of the ghazal that Faiz stopped reciting it in his 'mushairas' (poetry reciting events) and, instead, recommended that the audience ask Hassan to sing it for them, because the ghazal now belonged to Hassan.

In October 2010, Saregama, an Indian record label, released "Sarhadein" in which his first and last duet song Tera Milna featuring Hassan and Lata Mangeshkar was released. This song was composed by Hassan and written by Farhat Shahzad. Hassan recorded it in Pakistan in 2009, and Mangeshkar later heard the track and recorded her part in India in 2010, and the song was later mixed for a duet. The same duet was also sung by Hassan and Noor Jehan.

Following a severe illness in the late 1980s, Hassan cut back on his singing, eventually stepping down from playback singing altogether. Later, due to the severity of his illness, he completely departed from music.

== Death ==
Hassan suffered from a serious chronic lung condition for a few years before his death. He also received treatment for lung, urinary tract, and chest ailments at several hospitals in Pakistan for about 12 years prior to his death. Towards the end of 2000, he suffered his first stroke while in Kerala, India. In 2005, he was taken to India for ayurvedic treatment where he was welcomed by A.B. Vajpayee, Dilip Kumar, Lata Mangeshkar and many of his Indian fans. He suffered his second stroke soon after he returned from India which left him with speech impairments and limited his physical mobility. Hassan developed a severe chest infection and breathing difficulties in the days preceding his death. He died of multiple organ failure on 13 June 2012 at Aga Khan University Hospital in Karachi.

== Tributes ==
Hassan is widely regarded as one of the greatest singers in the sub-continent and is said to have revolutionized the way ghazals were sung. In 1977, Indian playback singer Lata Mangeshkar was so moved by his dulcet vocals during a New Delhi concert that she reportedly said, "Aisa lagta hai ke unke gale mein bhagwan boltein hain" (it seems as though like God is singing through his voice). On 18 July 2018, the day of his 91st birthday, Google featured Hassan on its homepage doodle. Pakistani Prime Minister Yousuf Raza Gilani paid tribute to Hassan, calling him "an icon who mesmerized music lovers" for decades. Indian Prime Minister Manmohan Singh stated that Hassan "brought the sub-continental Sufi sensibilities to life through his songs," and that "the influence of his passion for Urdu poetry and initial grooming in Dhrupad tradition earned for him a special place in the world of music."

== Musicians and his students worldwide ==
Some of the musicians who are associated with him :

- Ustad Pir Bakhsh, Tabla player
- Ustad Mohammed Hussain
- Ustad Tari Khan, Tabla player

Some of his students are:

- Pervaiz Mehdi
- Riaz Mehdi
- Talat Aziz
- Rajkumar Rizvi
- Salamat Ali
- Afzal, Munni Subhani
- Rehan Ahmed Khan
- Shamshad Husain Chanda
- Shahnaz Begum (Bangladesh)
- Yasmin Mushtari (Bangladesh)
- Irshad Ali Mehdi
- Hariharan
- Tari Khan
- Amir Yaseen
- Syed Zeeshan Ali (London UK)
- Alamgir Mir (London)
- Israr Chishti

== Family ==
Mehdi Hassan had 14 children. As many as 8 of his sons were active in the field of music. Unfortunately two of his sons died. List of his sons.

- Tariq Mehdi Hassan (Versatile Playback Singer)
- Arif Mehdi Hassan (Deceased) was Classical Tabla Player
- Asif Mehdi Hassan (Deceased) was a Playback & Ghazal Singer
- Kamran Mehdi Hassan Playback & Ghazal Singer)
- Imran Mehdi Hassan (Classical Tabla Player & Versatile Singer)
- Faizan Mehdi Hassan (Versatile Ghazal Singer).
- Sajjad Mehdi Hassan (Deceased) (D.S.P Punjab Police)
- Shahzad Mehdi Hassan ( Ghazal Singer)
- Waris Hassan Mehdi ( Pop Singer)

Mehdi Hassan has 5 grandsons and his one grandson is active in music

Adnan Hasan

Ali Hasan

Salman Hasan

Muhammad Mehdi Hassan (Classical Tabla Player)

Wali Hasan

== Awards ==
Pride of Performance Award Recipient
- Date: 1985
- Country: Islamic Republic of Pakistan
- Presented by: Islamic Republic of Pakistan
- Website: http://www.mehdihassan.com/

Hilal-i-Imtiaz Award Recipient
- Date: 2010
- Country: Islamic Republic of Pakistan
- Presented by: Islamic Republic of Pakistan
- Website: http://www.mehdihassan.com/

Nishan-e-Imtiaz Award Recipient
- Date: 2012
- Country: Islamic Republic of Pakistan
- Presented by: Islamic Republic of Pakistan
- Website: http://www.mehdihassan.com/

=== Civilian honours ===
The following civilian honours have been conferred on him, in chronological order.

==== The Government of India ====
- 1979 - K. L. Saigal Award in Jalandhar, India

==== The Government of Nepal ====
- 1983–Gorkha Dakshina Bahu

==== The Government of Pakistan ====
- 1985–Pride of Performance
- Tamgha-e-Imtiaz
- 2010–Hilal-e-Imtiaz
- 2012–Nishan-e-Imtiaz

=== Nigar Awards ===
- 1964–Nigar Award for Best Male Playback Singer for Farangi
- 1968–Nigar Award for Best Male Playback Singer for Saiqa
- 1969–Nigar Award for Best Male Playback Singer for Zarqa
- 1972–Nigar Award for Best Male Playback Singer for Meri Zindagi Hai Naghma
- 1973–Nigar Award for Best Male Playback Singer for Naya Rasta
- 1974–Nigar Award for Best Male Playback Singer for Sharafat
- 1975–Nigar Award for Best Male Playback Singer for Zeenat
- 1976–Nigar Award for Best Male Playback Singer for Shabana
- 1977–Nigar Award for Best Male Playback Singer for Aaina
- 1999–Nigar Award Special Millennium Award

He had been the recipient of numerous awards and recognitions: the Tamgha-i-Imtiaz granted to him by Gen Ayub Khan; the Pride of Performance bestowed on him by Gen Ziaul Haq; and the Hilal-i-Imtiaz conferred by Gen Pervez Musharraf. Besides the Nigar Film and Graduate Awards from Pakistan, he was presented the Saigal Award in Jalandhar, India, in 1979, whereas the Gorkha Dakshina Bahu Award was given to him in Nepal in 1983. Latterly, he travelled to Dubai to receive yet another award.

== Albums ==
Some of his albums are:

- Kehna Usey
- Nazarana
- Live at Royal Albert Hall
- Andaz-e-Mastana
- Classical Ghazals vol. 1, 2, 3
- Dil Jo Rota Hai
- Ghalib Ghazals
- Ghazals For Ever Vol 1
- Golden Collection Of Mehdi Hassan Vol 1, 2
- Golden Greats
- In Concert
- Khuli Jo Aankh
- Life Story
- Live at Khambays
- Live Concert in India
- Mehdi Hassan
- Mehdi Hassan Ghazals Vol. 1
- Sada E Ishq
- Sarhadein
- Sur Ki Koi Seema Nahin
- The Finest Ghazals
- The Legend
- Yaadgar Ghazalen Vol. 1
- Tarz (with Shobha Gurtu)
- Naqsh-e-Faryadi
- Mehdi Hassan (EMI-Pakistan Released) VOLUME 1
- Mehdi Hassan Sings Punjabi Film Hits (EMI-Pakistan Released)
- Mehdi Hassan (EMI-Pakistan Released) VOLUME 2
- Mehdi Hassan & Ghulam Ali: Eternal Jewels (Live At Ras Barse On Zee TV)
- Mehdi Hassan: The Ultimate Collection (Live At Ras Barse On Zee TV)

== Ghazals ==
Song / Ghazal Title	Poet / Lyricist	Raga	Year	Album / Collection	Film	Notes
Alam-e-Khwaab ho ya	—	Yaman	c. 1972	Classical Ghazals	Non-film	Radio Pakistan
Aagay Barhe Na Qissa-e-Ishq-e-Butaan Se Hum	Mirza Ghalib	—	c. 1968	Ghazals Vol. 1	Non-film	Early recording
Aaj tak yaad hai woh pyaar ka manzar	Shevan Rizvi	—	c. 1974	Ghazals Vol. 2	Sehray kay Phool	
Aaj Tu Ghair Sahi	Kemal Ahmad	Bhairavi	1975	Ghazals Vol. 3	Non-film	Signature ghazal
Aa Ke Sajda Nashin Kais Hua	Mir Taqi Mir	Kafi	c. 1970	Classical Ghazals	Non-film	
Aankhon Se Mili Aankhen	Fyaz Hashmi	—	c. 1976	Ghazals Vol. 4	Hazar Dastaan	
Aap Ki Aankhon Ne	—	—	c. 1973	Ghazals Vol. 2	Non-film	
Aap Ko Bhool Jaayen Hum	Tasleem Fazli	—	c. 1978	Ghazals Vol. 5	Tum Milay Pyar Mila	
Aaye Kuch Abr	Faiz Ahmed Faiz	—	1979	Faiz – Mehdi Hassan	Non-film	Faiz centenary phase
Ab Ke Hum Bichde To Shaayad	Ahmed Faraz	Yaman	1977	Ghazals Vol. 4	Angaray	
Ae Raushniyon Ke Shahr Bata	Tanvir Naqvi	—	c. 1975	Ghazals Vol. 3	Chingari	
Anjuman Anjuman Shanaasaayi	Tufail Hoshyaarpuri	—	c. 1974	Ghazals Vol. 3	Non-film	
Apno Ne Gham Diye To Yaad Aa Gaya	Khawaja Parvaiz	—	c. 1972	Ghazals Vol. 2	Anjaan	
Arz-e-Niyaz-e-Ishq Ke	Mirza Ghalib	—	c. 1971	Ghazals Vol. 2	Non-film	
Baat Karni Mujhe Mushkil Kabhi Aisi To Na Thi	Bahadur Shah Zafar	—	c. 1971	Golden Collection	Non-film	
Beqarari Si Beqarari Hai	Jaun Elia	—	c. 1976	Ghazals Vol. 4	Non-film	
Bheegi Hui Aankhon Ka	Tasleem Fazli	—	c. 1973	Ghazals Vol. 2	Be Misaal	
Bhuuli Bisri Chand Umeedein	Razi Tirmizi	—	c. 1978	Ghazals Vol. 5	Non-film	
Chalte Ho To Chaman Ko Chaliye	Mir Taqi Mir	Khamaj	c. 1969	Classical Ghazals	Non-film	
Chirag-e-Toor Jalao Bada Andhera Hai	Saghar Siddiqui	—	1974	Ghazals Vol. 3	Non-film	
Dekh To Dil Ke Jaan Se Uthta Hai	Mir Taqi Mir	Kafi	c. 1970	Classical Ghazals	Non-film	
Dekhna Unka Kankhiyon Se	Farhat Shahzad	—	c. 1975	Ghazals Vol. 3	Non-film	
Dil-e-Nadan Tujhe Hua Kya Hai	Mirza Ghalib	Yaman	1967	Ghazals Vol. 1	Non-film	Breakthrough ghazal
Dil-e-Veeran Hai Teri Yaad Hai Tanhai Hai	Khawaja Pervaiz	—	c. 1976	Ghazals Vol. 4	Aaina	
Dil Ki Baat Labon Par Laakar	Habib Jalib	—	c. 1973	Ghazals Vol. 2	Non-film	
Dil Mein Ab Yun Tere Bhule Huye Gham Aate Hain	Faiz Ahmed Faiz	—	c. 1974	Ghazals Vol. 3	Non-film	
Dayam Pada Hua Tere Dar Pe Nahin Hoon Main	Mirza Ghalib	Darbari Kanada	c. 1973	Classical Ghazals	Non-film	
Ek Baar Chale Aao	Tasleem Fazli	—	c. 1975	Ghazals Vol. 3	Aik Raat	
Ek Bus Tu Hi Nahin Mujhse Khafa Ho Baitha	Farhat Shezhad	—	c. 1978	Ghazals Vol. 5	Non-film	
Ek Jhalak Dikhla De	Tasleem Fazli	—	c. 1972	Ghazals Vol. 2	Mr. Ranjha	
Ek Sitam Aur Meri Jaan	Masroor Anwar	—	1978	Ghazals Vol. 5	Saiqa	
Fikr Hi Thahari To Dil Ko Fikr-e-Khubaan Kyon Na Ho	Josh Malihabadi	—	c. 1976	Ghazals Vol. 4	Non-film	
Gham Ki Aandhi Chali	—	Lalit	1972	Classical Ghazals	Non-film	
Ghazab Kiya Tere Waade Pe Aitbaar Kiya	Daagh Dehalvi	—	c. 1968	Golden Collection	Non-film	
Gulon Mein Rang Bhare Baad-e-Naubahar Chale	Faiz Ahmed Faiz	Yaman	1981	Faiz – Mehdi Hassan	Non-film	
Ik Khalish Ko Haasil-e-Umr-e-Ravaan Rehne Diya	Adeeb Saharanpuri	—	1974	Ghazals Vol. 3	Non-film	
Jab Koi Pyaar Se Bulaayega	Khawaja Parvaiz	—	1976	Ghazals Vol. 4	Zindagi Kitni Haseen Hai	
Jab Tere Nain Muskurate Hain	—	Sahara	1973	Classical Ghazals	Non-film	
Jo Chahte Ho Woh Kehte Ho	Aal-e-Raza Raza	Nat Bhairav	c. 1975	Classical Ghazals	Non-film	
Main Khayal Hoon Kisi Aur Ka	Saleem Kausar	—	1985	Golden Collection (Later Years)	Non-film	Late-career classic
Mohabbat Karne Waale	Hafeez Hoshiarpuri	Khamaj	1972	Classical Ghazals	Non-film	
Mujhe Tum Nazar Se Gira To Rahe Ho	Masroor Anwar	—	1974	Ghazals Vol. 3	Doraha	
Naavak Andaaz Jidhar Deeda-e-Jaana Honge	Momin Khan Momin	Darbari Kanada	c. 1971	Classical Ghazals	Non-film	
Patta Patta Boota Boota Haal Hamaara Jaane Hai	Mir Taqi Mir	Kafi	c. 1969	Classical Ghazals	Non-film	
Ranjish Hi Sahi Dil Hi Dukhaane Ke Liye Aa	Ahmed Faraz	Yaman	1981	Ghazals Vol. 6	Non-film	Most covered ghazal
Shola Tha Jal Bujha Hoon	Ahmed Faraz	Kirwani	1984	Ghazals Vol. 6	Non-film	
Yun Na Mil Mujhse Khafa Ho Jaise	Ehsan Danish Kandlvi	Bilawal, Bhairavi	c. 1978	Classical Ghazals	Non-film	
Yeh Mojeza Bhi Mohabbat Kabhi Dikhaaye Mujhe	Qateel Shifai	MadhuKauns	c. 1980	Classical Ghazals	Non-film	
Zindagi Mein To Sabhi Pyaar Kiya Karte Hain	Qateel Shifai	—	1983	Ghazals Vol. 6	Azmat	
Ulti Ho Gayi Sab Tadbeerein, Kuchh Na Dawa Ne Kaam Kiya	Mir Taqi Mir	—	c. 1967	Ghazals Vol. 1	Non-film	
Persian / Dari Ghazals (Kabul recordings)	Hafez, Sa‘di, others	—	1976	Kabul Radio Recordings	Non-film	Afghanistan tour

== See also ==
- Begum Akhtar
- Talat Mahmood
- Ghulam Ali
- Jagjit Singh
- Pankaj Udhas
