= Mehdi Imani Shahmiri =

Iranian film director

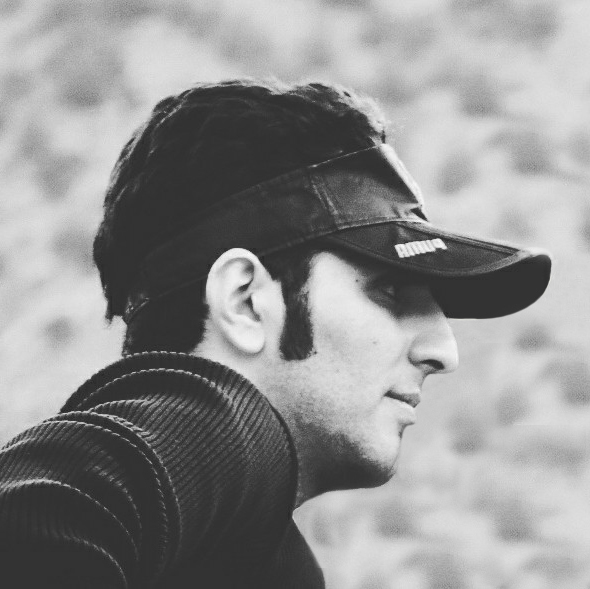
- Born: 3 April 1988 (age 37); Shahmirzad, Semnan, Iran
- Occupations: Film Producer; Film director; Screenwriter
- Years active: 2020 – present

Mehdi Imani Shahmiri (Persian: مهدی ایمانی شهمیری, born 3 April 1988) is an Iranian documentary filmmaker, producer, and screenwriter. He is known for directing Parizad and Born in Captivity.

In 2021, Shahmiri made the short documentary Parizad, which was nominated for the Dragon statue of the 62th Kraków Film Festival and received the Don Quixote Award of the International Federation of Film Societies (FICC).

In 2024 he directed Born in Captivity a documentary about the endangered Asiatic cheetah that followed the caesarean section and the birth of Pirouz, the famous cheetah cub among Iranians, for the first time.

Born in Captivity received a nomination for Best Documentary Feature at the Fajr International Film Festival and received the grand prize of the 17th Iran Documentary Film Festival - Cinema Verite. This film had the record number of nominations in the 17th edition of this festival.

== Filmography ==
=== Documentary ===
Year	Title	Director	Writer	Producer
2021	Parizad	Yes	Yes	Yes
2024	Born in Captivity	Yes	Yes	Yes

== Awards and nominations ==
Year	Award	Category	Nominated work	Result	Ref.
2021	17th Kazan International Festival of Muslim Cinema	Best short documentary	Parizad	Won	
2021	48th Festival of Nations	Best documentary	Parizad	Won	
2021	39th Asolo Art Film Festival	Best short film on art	Parizad	Won	
2021	8th Festival del cinema povero	Best documentary	Parizad	Won	
2021	14th Cinéma Vérité	Best director and editor	Parizad	Nominated	
2021	37th Tehran International Short Film Festival	Best director	Parizad	Nominated	
2021	Prague Independent Film Festival	Best director	Parizad	Nominated	
2021	25th Flickers' Rhode Island International Film Festival	Screen	Parizad	Official selection	
2022	62nd Kraków Film Festival	Don Quixote Award	Parizad	Won	
2022	36th Fribourg International Film Festival	Special mention	Parizad	Won	
2022	62nd Kraków Film Festival	Dragon of dragons	Parizad	Nominated	
2022	19th Big Sky Documentary Film Festival	Screen	Parizad	Official selection	
2022	36th Fribourg International Film Festival	Best director	Parizad	Nominated	
2024	17th Cinéma Vérité	Best film	Born in Captivity	Won	
2024	17th Cinéma Vérité	Best director	Born in Captivity	Nominated	
2024	42nd Fajr International Film Festival	Best documentary film	Born in Captivity	Nominated	
