= Mehdi Aghavali =

Mehdi Aghavli
Personal information
- Born: Salar Aghavali; July 2, 1982 (age 44) Tehran, iran

Professional wrestling career
- Ring name(s): Salar, mehdi
- Billed from: Tehran, iran
- Debut: 2010

Mehdi Aghavoli, known as Salar Aghavoli, born in 1982 in Shahryar (Tehran), Iran, is a first class international referee of the World Wrestling Federation.

== Judgments ==
- Asian Championship in Thailand - 2010
- Asian Championship in Uzbekistan - 2011
- Wrestling of Asian giants in India - 2013
- Wrestling of Asian giants in Hungary - 2016
- World Hopes Championship in Poland - 2017
- World Wrestling Cup in Shiraz - 2017
- Freestyle Wrestling World Cup in Kermanshah - 2018
- Judging in the 2018 Hungarian Olympic selection competitions
- Judging in the 2020 free and foreign wrestling world club competitions
- Judging in the 2021 World Youth Championship in Russia
