= INPEX =

Invention and New Product Exposition (INPEX)
- Status: Inactive
- Genre: Trade show
- Date: June
- Frequency: Annually
- Location: Pittsburgh, Pennsylvania
- Years active: 1984−2017
- Participants: About 300
- Attendance: 1000-1500
- Area: Worldwide
- Organizer: InventHelp
- Website: www.inpex.com

INPEX (Invention and New Product Exposition) was an invention trade show, held from 1985 to 2017 and organized by the invention promotion firm InventHelp. The annual show was held each June in Pittsburgh, Pennsylvania.

INPEX provided a forum for inventors to exhibit their inventions and pitch their ideas with companies interested in licensing, marketing or manufacturing their new products.

This trade show also hosted contests for domestic and international inventors (45 different categories), as well as seminars and workshops for both inventors and business attendees within the George Foreman Inventors University. The annual sponsor and producer of INPEX, InventHelp, markets promotional services to amateur inventors.

Inventions at INPEX ranged from simple products to highly technical devices, displayed as models, prototypes, or as a finished product for the mass market.

== History ==
INPEX was always held in Pittsburgh. The first trade show took place in 1982. 2015 was the 30th anniversary of the event. In 2017, InventHelp announced that INPEX was "going through a time of transition" and would not be hosting the show in 2018.

== Show highlights ==
=== 2014 ===
The show was held from June 18–20 with such keynote speakers as George Foreman, a retired American professional boxer, who is now engaged in entrepreneurship activity; and Maxine Clark, the founder of Build-A-Bear Workshop.

About 300 inventors were competing for medals in 40 categories, with inventors from the Philippines, Spain, Taiwan and Qatar. About 1000 business and marketing companies were named as potential visitors of this year’s show.

=== 2015 ===
The show was held at the Monroeville Convention Center from June 16–18 with keynote speakers including AJ Khubani, the CEO and President of TeleBrands Corporation, a company well known for “As Seen on TV” products.

About 275 inventors pitched their ideas and were eligible for medals in 45 categories. The show had contests for domestic and international inventors, including from the Philippines, Spain, Taiwan, and Korea. About 800 business and marketing companies were named as potential visitors of this year’s show.

=== 2016 ===
The 2016 edition of InventHelp’s INPEX was held from June 7 to June 9, 2016 and featured over 1,000 inventions from over 20 countries. The event was again headlined by the entrepreneur and former boxer George Foreman. The event was also attended by other conveners such as QVC, Brookstone, Cuisinart, Partsmaster, Allstar Products Group, Schroeder and Tremayne, Inc. The event allowed hundreds of inventors to showcase their inventions and new products in an effort to attract investors and partners.

The event allowed numerous inventors to showcase their inventions and products in an effort to attract investors and partners.

Larry Carswell took home the Grand Prix award for the "Mudder"; the world’s first cable-free ATV/UTV paddle winch.

== See also ==
- Invention
- List of inventors
- National Inventors Hall of Fame
- Patent model
- TRIZ approach
