= Parvez Mehdi =

Pakistani ghazal singer (1947-2005)

Parvez Mehdi, born Pervez Akhtar (1947 – 29 August 2005) was a Pakistani ghazal singer.

== Early life ==
Parvez Mehdi was born Pervez Akhtar in Lahore in 1947. He was trained in music by his father Bashir Hussain Rahi, who was also a singer.

== Career ==
Parvez Mehdi continued to learn under ghazal singer Mehdi Hassan (who gave him his stage-name of Parvez Mehdi) and under sitar player Siraj Ahmed Qureshi. His first performance at Radio Pakistan was in 1968. Beside ghazals, he also sang folk songs, geet and film songs. He also performed with Kahlid Ashghar, a qawwali singer of the 20th century.

Parvez Mehdi's first major breakthrough and rise to prominence came in the early 1970s, when he sang with noted folk singer of Pakistan Reshma on a Pakistan Television show.

== Awards and recognition ==
In 2005, he was nominated for his award on the Independence Day (Pakistan) (14 August 2005). He was officially conferred his Tamgha-i-Imtiaz (Medal of Distinction) Award on the following Pakistan Day (23 March 2006).

== Death ==
Parvez Mehdi died on 29 August 2005 from cardiac arrest in Lahore, Pakistan at the age of 58.

== Discography ==
Parvez Mehdi sang a famous duet with the singer Reshma, and also sang a popular song for a Noor Jehan for the Punjabi-language film Chann Tara (1973).
