= Mehdi Maïzi =

Algerian-French journalist (born 1986)

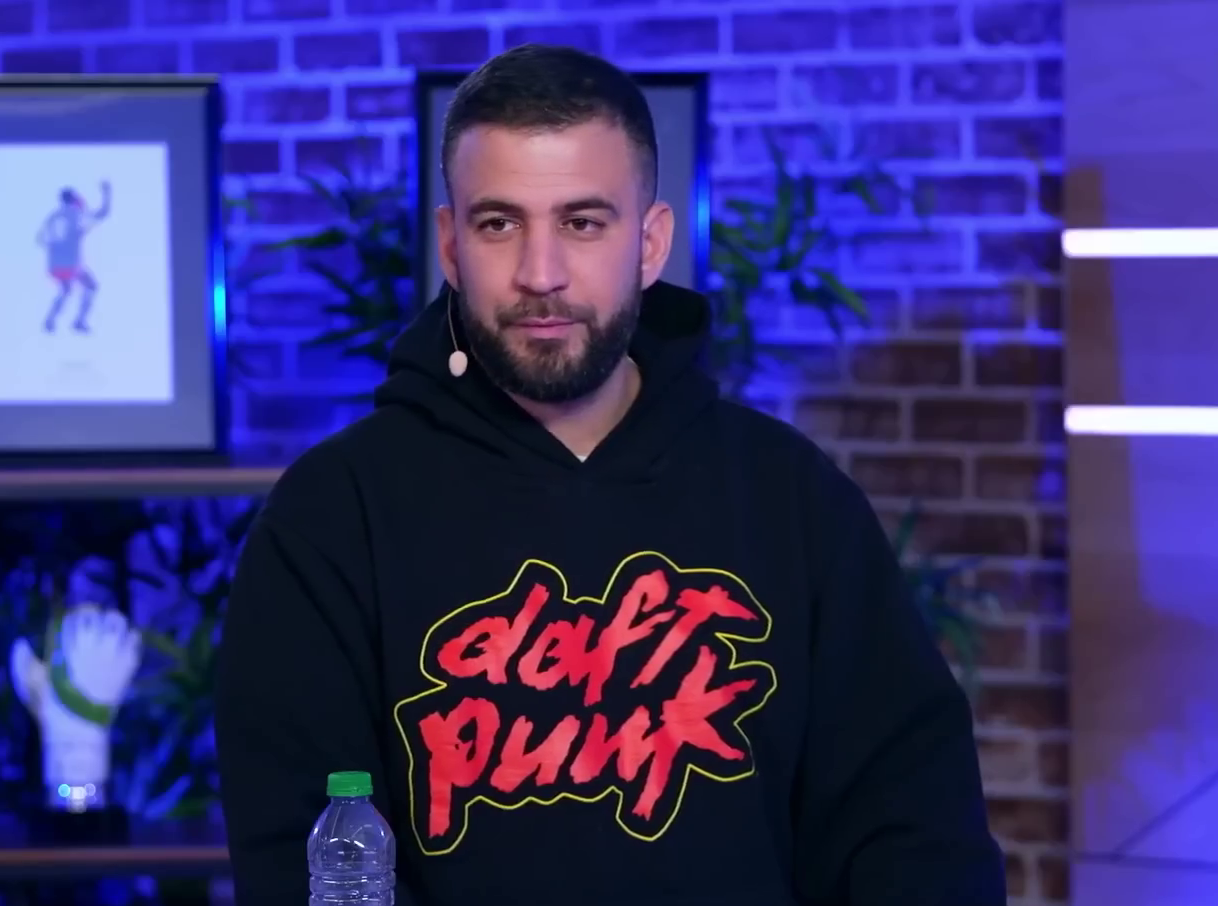
- Maïzi in 2023
- Born: 10 July 1986 (age 40); Aïn Taya, Algeria
- Education: Skema Business School
- Occupations: Journalist; musician; podcaster; newspaper columnist

Mehdi Maïzi (born 10 July 1986) is an Algerian–French music journalist and writer specializing in rap music.

== Early life and education ==
Mehdi Maïzi was born on 10 July 1986 in Aïn Taya, Algeria. At the end of the 1990s, the Algerian Civil War forced his family to flee because his father, a local television news presenter, had received several death threats.

In 2000, Maïzi sought refuge in France, obtained a science baccalaureate at the Marie Curie high school in Nogent-sur-Oise and then continued his studies in a preparatory class, which led him to enroll at the business school Skema, from which he graduated in 2010.

== Career ==
From 2008 to 2016, Maïzi worked as a volunteer journalist for Abcdr du son, a French online media outlet founded in 2000 and focused on rap music.

In 2015, Maïzi became a columnist for Monte le son !, a television program about the music industry broadcast on France 4. That same year, he became the host of the weekly podcast NoFun, where he discusses rap music with three other guests. The podcast ended in December 2019.

In April 2016, Maïzi joined OKLM Radio, an online radio station created by French rapper Booba. where he hosted "La Sauce", named after the song of the same name by Hamza, a show he shared with other commentators such as French rapper Driver. That same year, he wrote the book Rap français, une exploration en 100 albums (English: "French Rap: An Exploration in 100 Albums").

In 2017, Maïzi joined Deezer, where he was responsible for creating rap playlists. Between February 2018 and June 2019, he hosted the podcast "Speakeasy", where he interviewed various artists. In 2018, he also appeared temporarily as a commentator on Cyril Hanouna‘s show Balance ton post! on the television channel C8.

At Deezer, Maïzi was also responsible for overseeing the first two editions of the "La Relève" project, a 12-track compilation featuring new talents in French-language rap. The first was released in April 2019, and the second in October that same year.

In May 2019, on the Red Bull YouTube channel, Maïzi hosted "Rap Jeu", a bi-monthly game show where four rappers or actors from the rap world compete in challenges related to rap culture. Produced by Red Bull, hosted by Maïzi, written by Yérim and Ngiraan, and produced by Näkymä, the game is largely inspired by Burger Quiz.

That same year, Maïzi was poached from Deezer by the French branch of Apple Music, which he officially joined in February 2020 as head of hip-hop. Responsible for the platform's rap playlists and content, since June 2020 he has been hosting a weekly radio show exclusively for Apple subscribers, Le Code Radio, as well as a video interview broadcast on YouTube, Le Code.

Starting in September 2020, Maïzi joined the Tier List podcast with Neefa, Sandra Gomes, and Yérim Sar.

He continued to host Rap Jeu until finally leaving his position at the end of 2021, after around 60 episodes and the release of a board game. On 31 October 2022, another version of Le Code was launched, entitled Le Code Review, a bimonthly roundtable discussion where Maïzi, Sandra Gomes, and Raphaël Da Cruz discuss rap news. That same year, he contributed to the mixtape ZZCCMXTP, on the songs "Nous y sommes" and "Drake."

In June 2025, Maïzi joined France Inter for the weekly program L'Heure du rap, before taking over the reins of the daily show À la régulière, where he interviews musical artists as well as actors and actresses and figures of internet culture.
