= Anisa Mehdi =

Canadian film director and journalist

Anisa Marie Mehdi is an Iraqi-Canadian film director and journalist.

She graduated from Wellesley College in 1978 and obtained her master's degree in journalism from Columbia University.

She worked as an associate producer at CBS News in New York on the news magazine series West 57th. Her most notable documentary was Inside Mecca, which she produced and directed for National Geographic television. As executive producer of the PBS Frontline special "Muslims", she received the 2002 Cine Golden Eagle Award.

She is currently writing a biography on her father, Dr. Mohammad T. Mehdi, an Arab American activist in the United States. In 2007, Mehdi and two other writers launched the now-defunct Arab Writers Group Syndicate.

In February 2016, she joined the editorial board of the intelligence company Stratfor. As of 1998, Mehdi lives in Maplewood, New Jersey.

Anisa Mehdi is of half Iraqi and half Canadian descent.

== Filmography ==
- Inside Mecca (2003)
- Muslims (2002)
- Frontline (2002)
  - Muslims
