= Asif Mehdi =

- Born: 1966; Pakistan
- Died: 2 August 2021 (aged 55) Karachi, Pakistan
- Genres: Ghazal, playback singing
- Occupation: Singer
- Years active: 1983- 2021

Asif Mehdi (1966-2021) was a Pakistani ghazal singer and a playback singer in Lollywood, Pakistan. He was known much for reviving classical singing in his country as well as for being the son of Mehdi Hassan

== Early life ==
Born in Pakistan to Mehdi Hassan. He started his training at age 13 from his father and his uncle Ghulam Qadir. His family migrated from Mandawa in Rajasthan, to Pakistan at the time of partition of India in 1947.

== Performing career ==
Asif Mehdi performed with his father in Los Angeles in 1983 for the first time at age 17. When he sang, his father Mehdi Hasan was so annoyed that he rebuked him for singing in an effeminate voice. He has toured India, along with ghazal singer Jagjit Singh, in 2009 on the concert tour called Music for Peace which seeks to establish peaceful relations between India and Pakistan which share a common culture and language.

He, like his father, is fond of singing nazms by famous lyricists like Mir Taqi Mir, Ahmed Faraz, Qateel Shifai, Hafeez Jalandhari and Mirza Ghalib.

He signed a contract with Sony Entertainment last year and the album will be released across the globe in January 2010.

=== Films ===
He has done 60 movies in the Pakistani film industry.

== Awards ==
Asif Mehdi won the Nigar Award in 1999 for his playback singing.

== Personal life ==
Asif Mehdi lived with his family in Karachi, Pakistan, where he died on 2 August 2021.
