= Mehdi Nazeri =

Iranian photographer

- مهدی ناظری
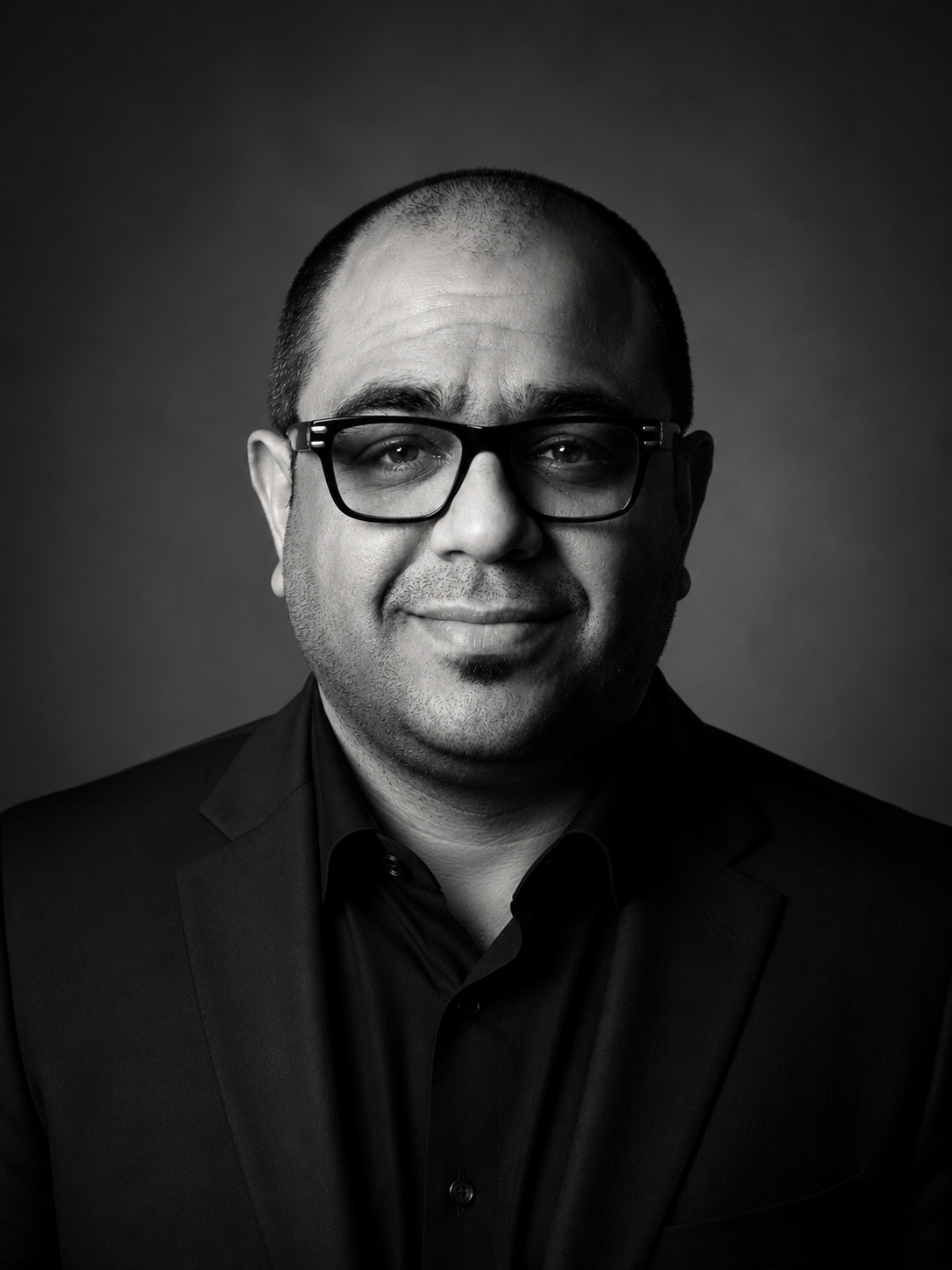
- Mehdi Nazeri
- Born: Bandar Abbas, Iran
- Resting place: Bandar Abbas
- Known for: Photographer
- Notable work: "Ali Hashem daily work"
- Website: Official website

Mehdi Nazeri (Persian: مهدی ناظری), is an Iranian photographer who works in the genre of social documentary photography.

== Biography ==
Nazeri started photography at the age of 22 and first started photomontage and documentary photography, but then turned to social documentary photography. He has been involved in various activities in the field of photography, including solo and group exhibitions, writing and teaching photography.

In 2015, he received the Bronze Medal of the Px3. In 2016, he won the first place in portraiture and the second place in the Moscow Photo Competition, and in the same year, he received "Honorable Mention" medal of International Photography Awards. In 2018, Nazeri received the title of Distinguished Artist from the Fédération Internationale de l'Art Photographique.

Additionally, he launched the Golden Shot International Photography Awards in 2024.
