= Mehdi Benchikhoune =

Algerian footballer (born 1996)

Personal information
- Full name: Mehdi Fetallah Benchikhoune
- Date of birth: April 3, 1996 (age 30)
- Place of birth: Azazga, Algeria
- Height: 1.82 m (6 ft 0 in)
- Position: Defender

Team information
- Current team: WA Boufarik

Youth career
- –2015: MC Alger
- 2016–2017: USM Alger

Senior career*
Years	Team	Apps	(Gls)
2017–2020	USM Alger	9	(0)
2019	→ WA Tlemcen (loan)	12	(0)
2020–	WA Boufarik	0	(0)

International career
2011–2012	Algeria U17	6	(0)
- * Club domestic league appearances and goals as of 31 October 2020

Mehdi Fetallah Benchikhoune (born April 3, 1996) is an Algerian footballer who plays for Algerian Ligue 2 club WA Boufarik.

In July 2017, Benchikhoune was promoted to USM Alger's senior team.
