= Outline of Kuwait =

Country in West Asia

The Flag of Kuwait

The Coat of arms of Kuwait

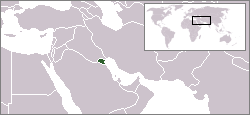
The location of Kuwait

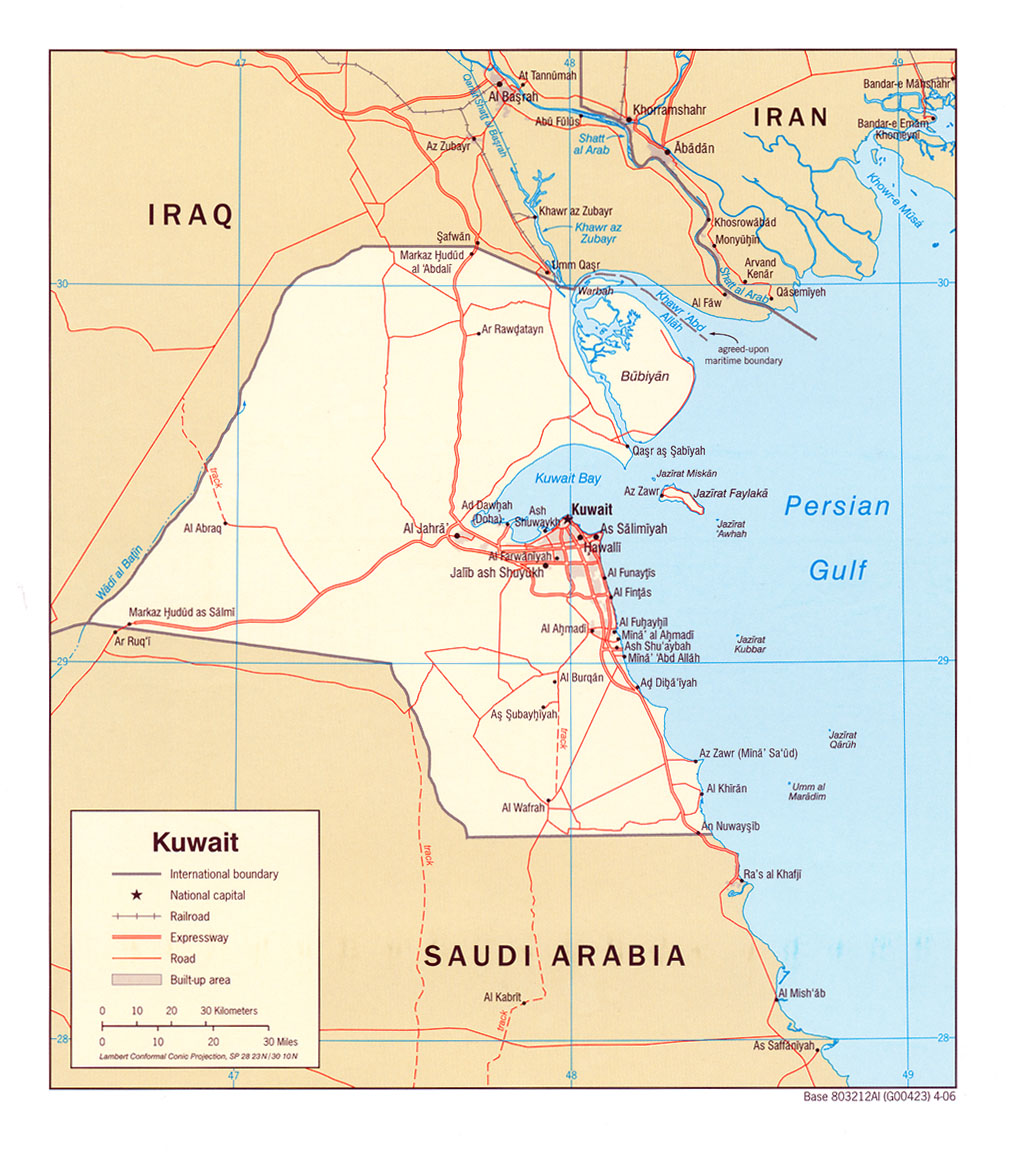
An enlargeable map of the State of Kuwait

Kuwait is a sovereign emirate located on the coast of the Persian Gulf in West Asia and the Middle East. Kuwait is bordered by Saudi Arabia to the south and Iraq to the north and west. The name of Kuwait is a diminutive of an Arabic word meaning "fortress built near water." It has a population of 4.1 million and an area of 17,818 km^{2}. Kuwait is a constitutional monarchy with a parliamentary system of government and Kuwait City serves as its political and economic capital.

== General reference ==
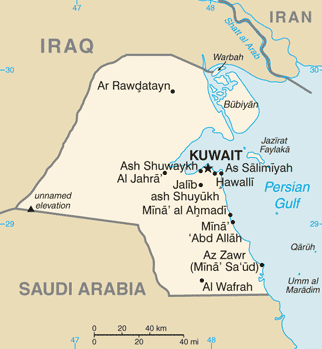
An enlargeable basic map of Kuwait

- Pronunciation: /kuːˈweɪt/; Kuwaiti Arabic: [lekˈwe:t̪]; Literary Arabic: /al kuˈwajt, -ˈweːt/
- Common English country name: Kuwait
- Official English country name: The State of Kuwait
- Common endonym(s): List of countries and capitals in native languages
- Official endonym(s): List of official endonyms of present-day nations and states
- Adjectival(s): Kuwaiti
- Demonym(s):
- Etymology: Name of Kuwait
- International rankings of Kuwait
- ISO country codes: KW, KWT, 414
- ISO region codes: See ISO 3166-2:KW
- Internet country code top-level domain: .kw

== Geography of Kuwait ==
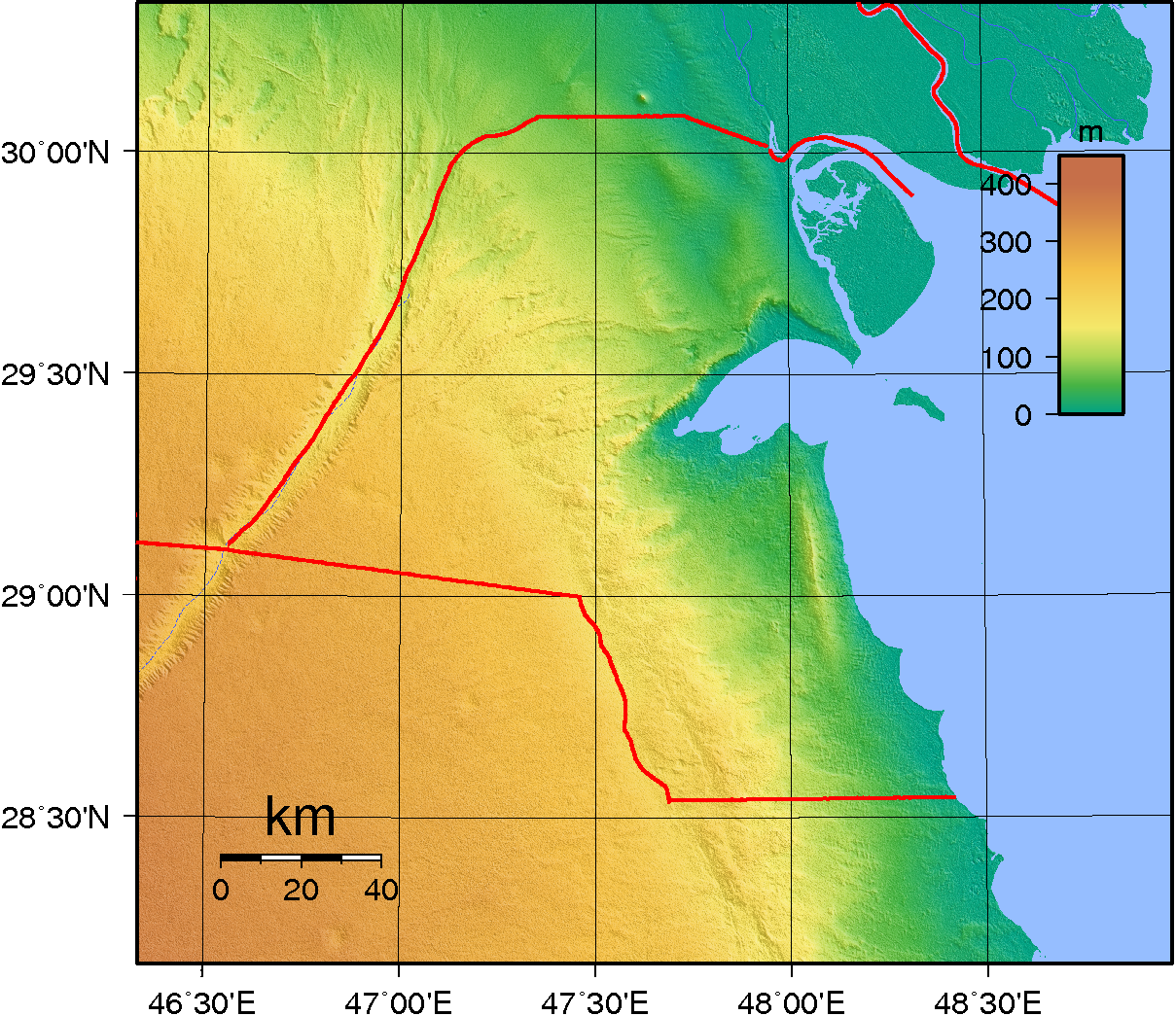
An enlargeable topographic map of Kuwait

Geography of Kuwait

- Kuwait is: a country
- Location:
  - Northern Hemisphere and Eastern Hemisphere
  - Eurasia
    - Asia
      - Southwest Asia
  - Middle East
    - Arabian Peninsula
  - Time zone: UTC+03
  - Extreme points of Kuwait
    - High: unnamed location 306 m (1,004 ft)
    - Low: Persian Gulf 0 m
  - Land boundaries: 462 km

Iraq 240 km
Saudi Arabia 222 km

- Coastline: Persian Gulf 499 km

- PopulationPopulation of Kuwait of Kuwait: 2,851,000 - 136th most populous country
- AreaArea of Kuwait of Kuwait: 17,818 km^{2}
- Atlas of Kuwait

=== Environment of Kuwait ===
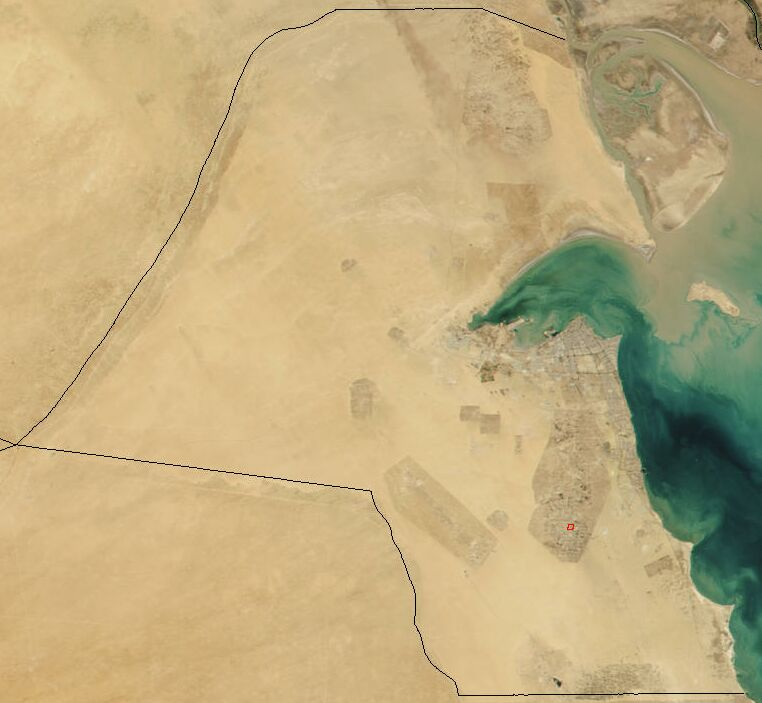
An enlargeable satellite image of Kuwait

Environmental issues in Kuwait

- Climate of Kuwait
- Renewable energy in Kuwait
- Geology of Kuwait
- Protected areas of Kuwait
  - Biosphere reserves in Kuwait
  - National parks of Kuwait
- Birds of Kuwait
- Mammals of Kuwait

==== Natural geographic features of Kuwait ====
- Bays of Kuwait
  - Kuwait Bay
- Islands of Kuwait
- Lakes of Kuwait: None
- Mountains of Kuwait
- Rivers of Kuwait
- World Heritage Sites in Kuwait

==== Ecoregions of Kuwait ====
List of ecoregions in Kuwait

==== Administrative divisions of Kuwait ====
Administrative divisions of Kuwait

- Governorates of Kuwait
  - Areas of Kuwait

===== Governorates of Kuwait =====
Governorates of Kuwait

- Areas of Kuwait

===== Districts of Kuwait =====
Districts of Kuwait

===== Municipalities of Kuwait =====
- Capital of Kuwait: Kuwait City

=== Demography of Kuwait ===
Demographics of Kuwait

== Government and politics of Kuwait ==
Politics of Kuwait

- Form of government:constitutional monarchy
- Capital of Kuwait: Kuwait City
- Elections in Kuwait
- Political parties in Kuwait

=== Branches of the government of Kuwait ===
Government of Kuwait

==== Executive branch of the government of Kuwait ====
- Head of state: Emir of Kuwait,
- Head of government: Prime Minister of Kuwait,
- Cabinet of Kuwait

==== Legislative branch of the government of Kuwait ====
- National Assembly (unicameral)

==== Judicial branch of the government of Kuwait ====
Court system of Kuwait

- Supreme Court of Kuwait

=== Foreign relations of Kuwait ===
Foreign relations of Kuwait

- Diplomatic missions in Kuwait
- Diplomatic missions of Kuwait
- Iraq–Kuwait relations

==== International organization membership ====
The State of Kuwait is a member of:

- African Development Bank Group (AfDB) (nonregional member)
- Arab Bank for Economic Development in Africa (ABEDA)
- Arab Fund for Economic and Social Development (AFESD)
- Arab Monetary Fund (AMF)
- Cooperation Council for the Arab States of the Gulf (GCC)
- Council of Arab Economic Unity (CAEU)
- Development Bank of Central African States (BDEAC)
- Food and Agriculture Organization (FAO)
- Group of 77 (G77)
- International Atomic Energy Agency (IAEA)
- International Bank for Reconstruction and Development (IBRD)
- International Chamber of Commerce (ICC)
- International Civil Aviation Organization (ICAO)
- International Criminal Court (ICCt) (signatory)
- International Criminal Police Organization (Interpol)
- International Development Association (IDA)
- International Federation of Red Cross and Red Crescent Societies (IFRCS)
- International Finance Corporation (IFC)
- International Fund for Agricultural Development (IFAD)
- International Hydrographic Organization (IHO)
- International Labour Organization (ILO)
- International Maritime Organization (IMO)
- International Mobile Satellite Organization (IMSO)
- International Monetary Fund (IMF)
- International Olympic Committee (IOC)
- International Organization for Standardization (ISO)
- International Red Cross and Red Crescent Movement (ICRM)
- International Telecommunication Union (ITU)
- International Telecommunications Satellite Organization (ITSO)
- International Trade Union Confederation (ITUC)
- Inter-Parliamentary Union (IPU)
- Islamic Development Bank (IDB)
- League of Arab States (LAS)
- Multilateral Investment Guarantee Agency (MIGA)
- Nonaligned Movement (NAM)
- Organisation of Islamic Cooperation (OIC)
- Organisation for the Prohibition of Chemical Weapons (OPCW)
- Organization of Arab Petroleum Exporting Countries (OAPEC)
- Organization of Petroleum Exporting Countries (OPEC)
- Permanent Court of Arbitration (PCA)
- United Nations (UN)
- United Nations Conference on Trade and Development (UNCTAD)
- United Nations Educational, Scientific, and Cultural Organization (UNESCO)
- United Nations Industrial Development Organization (UNIDO)
- United Nations Institute for Training and Research (UNITAR)
- Universal Postal Union (UPU)
- World Customs Organization (WCO)
- World Federation of Trade Unions (WFTU)
- World Health Organization (WHO)
- World Intellectual Property Organization (WIPO)
- World Meteorological Organization (WMO)
- World Tourism Organization (UNWTO)
- World Trade Organization (WTO)

=== Law and order in Kuwait ===
- Constitution of Kuwait
- Crime in Kuwait
  - Corruption in Kuwait
  - Human trafficking in Kuwait
  - Terrorism in Kuwait
- Human rights in Kuwait
  - LGBT rights in Kuwait
  - Freedom of religion in Kuwait
- Law enforcement in Kuwait
  - Kuwait Police
- Legal system of Kuwait

=== Military of Kuwait ===
Military of Kuwait

- Command
  - Commander-in-chief:
    - Ministry of Defence of Kuwait
- Forces
  - Army of Kuwait
  - Navy of Kuwait
  - Air Force of Kuwait
- Kuwait National Guard
- Military ranks of Kuwait

=== Local government in Kuwait ===
Local government in Kuwait

== History of Kuwait ==
History of Kuwait

== Culture of Kuwait ==
Culture of Kuwait

- Architecture of Kuwait
  - List of tallest buildings in Kuwait
- Cuisine of Kuwait
- Festivals in Kuwait
- Languages of Kuwait
  - Kuwaiti Arabic
  - Kuwaiti Persian
- Coat of arms of Kuwait
- Flag of Kuwait
- Media in Kuwait
  - Newspapers in Kuwait
  - Television in Kuwait
- National anthem of Kuwait
- 'Ajam of Kuwait
- People of Kuwait
- Prostitution in Kuwait
- Public holidays in Kuwait
- Records of Kuwait
- Religion in Kuwait
  - Buddhism in Kuwait
  - Christianity in Kuwait
  - Hinduism in Kuwait
  - Islam in Kuwait
- World Heritage Sites in Kuwait

=== Art in Kuwait ===
- Art of Kuwait
- Cinema of Kuwait
- Literature of Kuwait
- Music of Kuwait
- Theater of Kuwait

=== Sports in Kuwait ===
Sports in Kuwait

- Football in Kuwait
- Kuwait at the Olympics

== Economy and infrastructure of Kuwait ==
Economy of Kuwait

- Economic rank, by nominal GDP (2007): 53rd (fifty-third)
- Agriculture in Kuwait
- Banking in Kuwait
  - National Bank of Kuwait
  - Kuwait Finance House
- Communications in Kuwait
  - Internet in Kuwait
- Companies of Kuwait
- Currency of Kuwait: Dinar
  - ISO 4217: KWD
- Energy in Kuwait
  - Energy policy of Kuwait
  - Petroleum industry in Kuwait
- Healthcare in Kuwait
  - Health in Kuwait
- Mining in Kuwait
- Kuwait Stock Exchange
- Tourism in Kuwait
  - Visa policy of Kuwait
- Transport in Kuwait
  - Airports in Kuwait
  - Rail transport in Kuwait
  - Roads in Kuwait

== Education in Kuwait ==
Education in Kuwait

- Coeducation in Kuwait

== See also ==
Kuwait

- Index of Kuwait-related articles
- List of international rankings
- List of Kuwait-related topics
- Member state of the United Nations
- Outline of Asia
- Outline of geography
