= Telecommunications in Kuwait =

Telecommunications in Kuwait provides information about the telephone, Internet, radio, and television infrastructure in Kuwait.

== Infrastructure ==
=== Telephones ===
Telephones - main lines in use: 514,700 (2011), 510,300 (2005)

Telephones - mobile cellular: 4.9 million (2011), 2.7 million (2007)

Telephone system:

- general assessment: the quality of service is excellent
- domestic: new telephone exchanges provide a large capacity for new subscribers; trunk traffic is carried by microwave radio relay, coaxial cable, open-wire and fiber-optic cable; a cellular telephone system operates throughout Kuwait, and the country is well supplied with pay telephones.
- international: linked to international submarine cable Fiber-Optic Link Around the Globe (FLAG); linked to Bahrain, Qatar, UAE via the Fiber-Optic Gulf (FOG) cable; coaxial cable and microwave radio relay to Saudi Arabia; satellite earth stations - 6 (3 Intelsat - 1 Atlantic Ocean and 2 Indian Ocean, 1 Inmarsat - Atlantic Ocean, and 2 Arabsat)
- country code: 965

=== Broadcast media ===
Radio broadcast stations: AM 6, FM 11, shortwave 1 (1998)

Radios: 1.175 million (1997)

Television broadcast stations: 13 (plus several satellite channels) (1997)

Televisions: 875,000 (1997)

=== Internet ===
Internet Service Providers (ISPs): 3 (2026) Which are: Zain, Ooredoo, STC, and Starlink

Internet users: 1,925,956 or 74.2% of the population (2011), 700,000 (2005)

Top-level domain: .kw

== See also ==
- Telephone numbers in Kuwait
- Television in Kuwait
- Wataniya Telecom
