= Slavery in Kuwait =

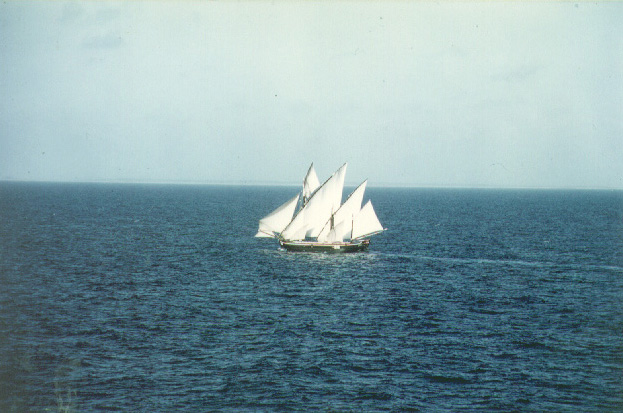
Dhows were used to transport goods and slaves.

Open chattel slavery existed in Kuwait until 1949. Slavery was formally abolished in Kuwait in 1949. In practice, slavery was not actually abolished as such, but the law no longer recognized it after 1949, which meant that every slave who applied for manumission was guaranteered to be freed. Many members of the Afro-Arabian minority are descendants of the former slaves. Slavery of people from Africa and East Asia was succeeded by the modern Kafala system of poor workers from the same region were slaves had previously been imported.

== History ==
In the 1890s, the British Empire gained control over the area. However, the British did not interfere with the inner policy of the state, but was content with keeping peace with the indigenous power holders, protecting British citizens, and managing the contacts with the international community, in which they assured that Kuwait obeyed the same international treaties signed by the British themselves.

=== Slave trade ===
During the Omani Empire (1692–1856), Oman was a center of the Zanzibar slave trade. Slaves were trafficked from the Swahili coast of East Africa via Zanzibar to Oman. From Oman, the slaves were exported to the rest of the Arabian Peninsula and Persia, including the Trucial States, Qatar, Bahrain and Kuwait. The Omani slave trade from Africa started to shrink in the late 19th century.

A second route of slave trade existed, with people from both Africa and East Asia, who were smuggled to Jeddah in the Arabian Peninsula in connection to the Muslim pilgrimage, Hajj, to Mecca and Medina. Victims were tricked to perform the journey willingly in the belief that they were going on the Hajj pilgrimage or employed as servants and then sold upon arrival. The method of kidnapping was also used. These slaves were then exported from the Hejaz to Oman, the Trucial States, Qatar, Bahrain and Kuwait.

In the 1940s, a third slave trade route was noted, in which people from Balochistan were shipped across the Persian Gulf, many of whom had sold themselves or their children to escape poverty. In 1943, it was reported that girls from Balochistan were shipped via Oman and the Trucial States to Mecca, where they were popular as concubines, since Caucasian girls were no longer available, and were sold for $350–450.

The price of slaves was higher in Kuwait than the rest of the Gulf, and slaves used to be kidnapped to Kuwait. Children were kidnapped from Yemen, and girls from Armenia, Georgia and Iraqi Kurdistan where trafficked to the slave market to be sold for marriage.

After 1924, when the import of white slave girls was prohibited, Kuwaiti people who wanted to purchase a white slave (white slaves were normally girls), defined the cost as a "dowry" in order to avoid any charge brought against them by the British, and made it possible for them to get their money back in case the girl applied for a manumission, which had become a possibility by that point. In the 1920s, white slave girls in Kuwait were often brought to Kuwait from Iraqi Kurdistan by Kurdish merchants, who bribed the custom officials and sold the girls to Kuwaiti slave-brokers.

In the 1920s, slaves in Kuwait were held in cramped conditions in slave shops where the prospective customers came to view them and haggle over the price.

=== Function and conditions ===
Female slaves were primarily used as either domestic servants, or as concubines (sex slaves), while male slaves were primarily used within the pearl industry as pearl divers. Slave servants were called often cammí (uncle) and cammat (aunt). Male slaves where used in a number of tasks: as soldiers, pearl divers, farm labourers, cash crop workers, maritime sailors, dock workers, porters, irrigation canal workers, fishermen, and domestic servants, while women functioned as domestic servants or concubines.

In 1904, there were about 4,000 Africans in Kuwait out of a total population of 35,000, two-thirds of whom were slaves and the rest former slaves.

There were estimated to have been twice as many female as male slaves in Kuwait. Non-African female slaves were sold in the Persian Gulf where they were bought for marriage; these were fewer and often Armenian, Georgian, or from Baluchistan and India. In the 19th century, Indian girls from the Malabar coast were trafficked for sexual services to the Gulf coast.

Black African women were primarily used as domestic house slaves rather than exclusively for sexual services, while white Caucasian women (normally Circassian or Georgian) were preferred as concubines (sex slaves), and when the main slave route of white slave girls was reduced after Russia's conquest of the Caucasus and Central Asia in the mid 19th-century (reducing the Black Sea slave trade and the Kazakh Khanate slave trade), Baluchi and "Red" Ethiopian (Oromo and Sidamo) women became the preferred targets for sexual slavery. Non-African female slaves were sold in the Persian Gulf where they were bought for marriage; these were fewer and often Armenian, Georgian, or from Baluchistan and India. In 1924, the law prohibited the enslavement of white girls (normally Armenian or Georgian) on Kuwaiti territory, but in 1928 at least 60 white slave girls were discovered.

Female slaves were often used for sexual services as concubines for a period of time, and then sold or married off to other slaves; the slave owners would arranged both marriages and divorce for their slaves, and the offspring of two slaves would become slaves in turn. It was common for slave owners to claim sexual services of married female slaves when the slave husband was away for long periods of time, to hunt for pearls or fish or similar labor, and sexual abuse was a common reason given when female slaves applied for manumission at the British Agency. It was common for Arab men to use the sexual services of enslaved African women, but a male African slave who had sexual relations with a local "pure blood" Arab woman would be executed to preserve tribal honor and social status, regardless if the couple had married or not.

The number of female slaves in the Gulf was as high or higher than that of male slaves, but the number of female slaves who made applications for manumission at the British Agencies in the Gulf was significantly lower (only 280 of 950 documented cases in 1921–1946), likely because in the Islamic society of the Gulf, were women were excluded from wage labour and public life, it was impossible for a freedwoman to survive without a male protector.

In 1924, the law prohibited the enslavement of white girls (normally Armenian or Georgian) on Kuwaiti territory, but in 1928 at least 60 white slave girls were discovered.

In 1930, the British official report claimed that there were two thousand slaves in Kuwait, mostly house slaves born in captivity, and 100 pearl divers.

== Activism against slave trade ==
The British Empire, having signed the 1926 Slavery Convention, was obliged to fight slavery and slave trade in all land under direct or indirect control of the British Empire. Since Kuwait were formally under British control, the British were expected to enforce this policy in the region. Officially, the British declared that they did just that, but in reality, the slavery and slave trade was tolerated by the British.

The British considered their control over the region insufficient to do something about the slavery and the slave trade. The British policy was therefore to assure the League of Nations that Kuwait followed the same anti slavery treaties signed by the British, but in parallel prevent any international observations of the area, which would disprove these claims.

In the 1920s Sheikh Ahmad of Kuwait declared that slavery was an obstacle for progress; while there was no anti slavery treaty in Kuwait, the sheikh bought and manumitted slaves not treated well, and started to pay his slave servants wages.

In both 1932 and 1935, the British colonial authorities refused to interfere in the slavery of the Trucial States, Qatar, Bahrain and Kuwait, since they were afraid that they could lose control over the area if they should attempt to enforce a policy against slavery, and they therefore prevented all international observations of the area which could force them to take action. In 1932, the official report of the India Office to the Committee of Experts on Slavery that while Kuwait had no British agent to assist in the manumission of slaves, as was the case in the Trucial states, the British officially claimed that slavery in Kuwait was limited to house slaves.

In 1935, the British authorities assured the League of Nations that with the exception of Kuwait, all the British controlled states by the Persian Gulf, such as the Trucial States, Qatar and Bahrain had banned the slave trade due to treaties with the British, but while at the same time, the British refused any international inspections in the region which would have revealed that a substantional slave trade was in fact going on, especially within the pearl fish industry, were the slaves were particularly harshly treated.

In 1936, the British finally acknowledged in their report to the Advisory Committee of Experts on Slavery of the League of Nations that there was still ongoing slavery and slave trade in the Trucial States, Oman and Qatar, but claimed that it was limited; that all slaves who sought asylum at the British Agents Office in Sharjah were granted manumission and that the slave trade had stopped entirely in Kuwait and Bahrain. The official report of the British Foreign Office of 1936 claimed that although there was no anti slavery treaty with Kuwait, the shaykh of Kuwait had "completely stamped out the sale of new slaves", and that the existing slaves were free to complain to the sultan, who manumitted them if their complaints could not be resolved some other way, which was claimed to have diminished the number of slaves in Kuwait.

In reality, the British reports were deliberately playing down the size of the actual substantial slave trade going on in the region, and refused to allow international inspection. The British officially reported in the 1930s that slavery in Kuwait was practically nonexistent, despite the common house slaves at this time. In the 1940s, there were several suggestions made by the British to combat the slave trade and the slavery in the region, but none was considered enforceable.

=== Abolition ===
After World War II, there was a growing international pressure from the United Nations to end the slave trade. In 1948, the United Nations declared slavery to be a crime against humanity in the Universal Declaration of Human Rights, after which the Anti-Slavery Society pointed out that there were about one million slaves in the Arabian Peninsula, which was a crime against the 1926 Slavery Convention, and demanded that the UN form a committee to handle the issue.

After 1949, slavery was no longer legally recognized in Kuwaiti legal courts, and the policy of the ruler from that year forward was to automatically issue a manumission certificate for every slave who applied for it. In the rest of the Gulf states, slaves could be freed by the British, who had the power to issue manumission certificates for slaves who applied to them; in Kuwait the British had no such right, since they had no slavery treaty with Kuwait, but the ruler's policy was to free any slave who applied for manumission from the British. By 1952, no slave had reportedly applied for such as certificate for three years, which led the British to officially assume that slavery was in practice abolished or that the remaining slaves were content and therefore did not apply for manumission.

In 1957 the British pressured the Gulf rulers to accept the 1956 Supplementary Slavery Convention in accordance with the Colonial Application; this was accepted by Kuwait, Qatar and Bahrain, but the rulers of the Trucial coast stated that such a law could not be enforced.

Many members of the Afro-Arabian minority are descendants of the former slaves.

== Modern slavery ==
=== Kafala system in Kuwait ===
After the abolition of slavery, poor migrant workers were employed under the Kafala system (sponsorship). Human rights organizations and scholars have frequently compared aspects of this system to modern slavery or forced labour, citing workers dependency on employers restrictions on mobility, and vulnerability to exploitation, although comparison remains debated and varies by country and reform context.

The kafala system is practiced in Kuwait. The main legal source for the kafala system in Kuwait is the 1959 Aliens’ Residence Law and its implementing regulations. This law not only provided that all foreign workers should have a local sponsor, but also that the responsibility of monitoring the foreign workers lies with the sponsor. Furthermore, migrant workers were also covered the 1964 Law concerning Labour in the Private Sector, the sector in which most foreign workers are active. The legal system regulating foreign workers has been changing since the early 2000s. For example, in 2007, the Kuwaiti Ministry of Labor and Social Affairs implemented a decree which prohibited employers from taking their employees’ passports. In 2009, another decree was issued, which allowed migrant workers to change employers without the employer's consent. However, this would only be a possibility after the initial employment contract was completed, or after the worker had been employed for three consecutive years.

In 2010, the Kuwaiti Minister of Social Affairs and Labor announced that it would abolish the kafala system, requesting the assistance of the ILO on policy issues related to migrant workers. New labor laws were implemented in 2010. One major change was the creation of an agency, the Public Authority for Manpower (PAM), which has the sole responsibility for the importation and employment of foreign workers. The agency also works to prevent the practice of visa trading, in which sponsors or local agencies would charge potential migrant workers large sums for work visas in exchange for employment, without providing the migrant with actual employment. Additionally, the new labor laws placed limits on daily working hours, while also providing for end-of-service payments, paid maternity leave and access to labor dispute settlement mechanisms. The 2010 laws also incorporated the 2009 ministerial decree regarding the possibility to change employers into actual law, while maintaining the requirements of the 2009 decree. However, the new laws did not set a minimum wage requirements, did not allow for the creation of labor unions and did not cover domestic workers.

In 2015, the Ministry of Labor and Social Affairs of Kuwait approved a standardized labor contract for foreign workers in the private sector, issued by the PAM, which specifies end-of-contract compensation, holidays and leaves. The standardized contract allows for additional articles to be added as long as these extra articles comply with Kuwait's labor laws. Furthermore, the government distributed copies of this standardized contract among embassies for translation. In the same year, the government adopted new labor laws which extended labor rights to domestic workers and in 2016 the government set a minimum wage for domestic work.

In 2018, Kuwait became involved in a diplomatic crisis with the Philippines, which ended in a May 2018 labor deal which prohibited common practices under the kafala against Filipino migrant workers, including the confiscation of passports and guaranteeing one-day off a week from work.

== See also ==
- Human trafficking in Kuwait
- Human rights in Oman
- History of slavery in the Muslim world
- History of concubinage in the Muslim world
- Human trafficking in the Middle East
- Kafala system
