= Television in Kuwait =

The state broadcaster Kuwait Television operates the domestic channels, including KTV1 (music shows, internal news, current affairs and official conferences coverage), KTV2 (family programmes in English, Kuwaiti TV series subbed in English and English Movies subbed in Arabic), Al Akhbar (the main international news coverage channel), and KTV Sport (formerly KTV3).

There are 28 free-to-air satellite channels headquartered in Kuwait, 21 of which are privately owned. Direct-to-home is the dominant platform in the pay-television market. KCV is the only provider of cable television.

== List of channels ==
=== Official channels ===
- KTV 1
- Kuwait Plus
- KTV 2 in English
- Al Majlis
- Al Gurain
- Al Akhbar
- Al Aflam
- Al Cinema
- Al Comedy
- Al Classic
- Al Clip
- Al Mousica
- Al Atfal
- Al Sofra
- Al Emarat TV
- Al Magazine
- KTV 3 Sports channel
- KTV 3 Sport Plus Second Sports channel
- Al-Arabi TV documentary Channel
- Al-Resalah TV
- Alafasy TV

=== Other channels ===
- Alrai TV
- Funoon TV ( Turned into Funoon ATV in 2020(??) )
- Scope TV
- Alwatan TV (Shut down 2015)

== See also ==
- List of Arabic-language television channels
