= List of birds of Kuwait =

This is a list of the bird species recorded in Kuwait. The avifauna of Kuwait include a total of 416 species, of which 8 have been introduced by humans. One species listed is extirpated in Kuwait.

This list's taxonomic treatment (designation and sequence of orders, families and species) and nomenclature (common and scientific names) follows the Official List of Kuwait Birds, which in turn follows the Ornithological Society of the Middle East Region List, with additional subspecies updates to the IOC World Bird List, Version 15.1. The family accounts at the beginning of each heading reflect this taxonomy, as do the species counts found in each family account. Introduced and accidental species are included in the total counts for Kuwait.

The following tags have been used to highlight several categories. The commonly occurring native species do not fall into any of these categories.

- (A) Accidental - a species that rarely or accidentally occurs in Kuwait
- (I) Introduced - a species introduced to Kuwait as a consequence, direct or indirect, of human actions
- (Ex) Locally extinct - a species that no longer occurs in Kuwait although populations exist elsewhere
- (X) Extinct - a species or subspecies that no longer exists

== Ducks, geese, and waterfowl ==
Order: Anseriformes Family: Anatidae

Anatidae includes the ducks and most duck-like waterfowl, such as geese and swans. These birds are adapted to an aquatic existence with webbed feet, flattened bills, and feathers that are excellent at shedding water due to an oily coating.

Common name	Binomial name	Status in the country	Global status	Trend	Notes	Image
Mute swan	Cygnus olor	A	Least concern	▲	Single vagrant record from 1997	
Greylag goose	Anser anser	N	Least concern	▲	Winter visitor; subspecies A. a. rubrirostris	
Greater white-fronted goose	Anser albifrons	A	Least concern	?	Vagrant; subspecies A. a. albifrons	
Common shelduck	Tadorna tadorna	N	Least concern	▲	Scarce winter visitor	
Ruddy shelduck	Tadorna ferruginea	A	Least concern	?	Vagrant	
Garganey	Spatula querquedula	N	Least concern	▼	Passage migrant and winter visitor	
Northern shoveler	Spatula clypeata	N	Least concern	▼	Winter visitor	
Gadwall	Mareca strepera	N	Least concern	▲	Scarce winter visitor	
Eurasian wigeon	Mareca penelope	N	Least concern	▼	Winter visitor	
Mallard	Anas platyrhynchos	N	Least concern	▲	Common winter visitor	
Northern pintail	Anas acuta	N	Least concern	▼	Winter visitor	
Eurasian teal	Anas crecca	N	Least concern	?	Winter visitor	
Marbled teal	Marmaronetta angustirostris	A	Vulnerable	▼	Vagrant	
Red-crested pochard	Netta rufina	A	Least concern	?	Vagrant	
Common pochard	Aythya ferina	R	Vulnerable	▼	Scarce migrant	
Ferruginous duck	Aythya nyroca	N	Near threatened	▼	Formerly a vagrant, now a rare established breeder	
Tufted duck	Aythya fuligula	N	Least concern	Steady	Rare winter visitor	
Long-tailed duck	Clangula hyemalis	R	Vulnerable	▼	Vagrant	
Red-breasted merganser	Mergus serrator	A	Least concern	Steady	Single vagrant record from 1997	

== Pheasants, grouse, and allies ==
Order: Galliformes Family: Phasianidae

The Phasianidae are a family of terrestrial birds which consists of quails, partridges, snowcocks, francolins, spurfowls, tragopans, monals, pheasants, peafowls and jungle fowls. In general, they are plump (although they vary in size) and have broad, relatively short wings.

Common name	Binomial name	Status in the country	Global status	Trend	Notes	Image
See-see partridge	Ammoperdix griseogularis	I	Least concern	Steady	Introduced	
Common quail	Coturnix coturnix	N	Least concern	▼	Passage migrant	
Chukar partridge	Alectoris chukar	I	Least concern	Steady	Introduced	
Black francolin	Francolinus francolinus	A	Least concern	Steady	Vagrant	

== Flamingos ==
Order: Phoenicopteriformes Family: Phoenicopteridae

Flamingos are gregarious wading birds, usually 1 to 1.5 metres (3 to 5 ft) tall, found in both the Western and Eastern Hemispheres. Flamingos filter-feed on shellfish and algae. Their oddly shaped beaks are specially adapted to separate mud and silt from the food they consume and, uniquely, are used upside-down.

Common name	Binomial name	Status in the country	Global status	Trend	Notes	Image
Greater flamingo	Phoenicopterus roseus	N	Least concern	▲	Common overwintering species; scarce breeder	
Lesser flamingo	Phoeniconaias minor	A	Near threatened	▼	Vagrant occasionally recorded, often alongside its more common relative	

== Grebes ==
Order: Podicipediformes Family: Podicipedidae

Grebes are small to medium-large freshwater diving birds. They have lobed toes and are excellent swimmers and divers. However, they have their feet placed far back on the body, making them quite ungainly on land.

Common name	Binomial name	Status in the country	Global status	Trend	Notes	Image
Little grebe	Tachybaptus ruficollis	N	Least concern	▼	Resident	
Slavonian grebe	Podiceps auritus	A	Vulnerable	▼	Vagrant with 2 records	
Red-necked grebe	Podiceps grisegena	A	Least concern	▼	Vagrant	
Great crested grebe	Podiceps cristatus	R	Least concern	?	Rare passage migrant	
Black-necked grebe	Podiceps nigricolis	N	Least concern	?	Winter visitor	

== Pigeons and doves ==
Order: Columbiformes Family: Columbidae

Pigeons and doves are stout-bodied birds with short necks and short slender bills with a fleshy cere.

Common name	Binomial name	Status in the country	Global status	Trend	Notes	Image
Rock dove (and domestic variants)	Columba livia	N	Least concern	▼	Domestic variants common everywhere, wild rock doves may be found near the coast	
Stock dove	Columba oenas	A	Least concern	▲	Vagrant	
Common wood pigeon	Columba palumbus	N	Least concern	▲	Overwintering species	
European turtle dove	Streptopelia turtur	R	Vulnerable	▼	Rare breeder	
Oriental turtle dove	Streptopelia orientalis	R	Least concern	Steady	Scarce disperser, very prone to vagrancy and often found outside its defined migratory range	
Eurasian collared dove	Streptopelia decocto	N	Least concern	▲	Common	
African collared dove	Streptopelia roseogrisea	I	Least concern	?	Introduced; similar to the Eurasian relative; however, the tail has a different underside pattern	
Laughing dove	Streptopelia senegalensis	N	Least concern	Steady	Common	
Namaqua dove	Oena capensis	N	Least concern	▲	Resident and scarce disperser	

== Sandgrouse ==
Order: Pterocliformes Family: Pteroclidae

Sandgrouse have small, pigeon like heads and necks, but sturdy compact bodies. They have long pointed wings and sometimes tails and a fast direct flight. Flocks fly to watering holes at dawn and dusk. Their legs are feathered down to the toes.

Common name	Binomial name	Status in the country	Global Status	Trend	Notes	Image
Pin-tailed sandgrouse	Pterocles alchata	N	Least concern	Steady	Increasingly rare overwintering species	
Chestnut-bellied sandgrouse	Pterocles exustus	A	Least concern	Steady	Vagrant	
Spotted sandgrouse	Pterocles senegallus	N	Least concern	Steady	Scarce passage migrant	
Black-bellied sandgrouse	Pterocles orientalis	N	Least concern	▼	Rare overwintering species	

== Bustards ==
Order: Otidiformes Family: Otididae

Bustards are large terrestrial birds mainly associated with dry open country and steppes in the Old World. They are omnivorous and nest on the ground. They walk steadily on strong legs and big toes, pecking for food as they go. They have long broad wings with "fingered" wingtips and striking patterns in flight. Many have interesting mating displays.

Common name	Binomial name	Status in the country	Global status	Trend	Notes	Image
MacQueen's bustard	Chlamydotis macqueenii	R	Vulnerable	▼	Formerly a resident breeder, now an irregular winter visitor	

== Cuckoos ==
Order: Cuculiformes Family: Cuculidae

The family Cuculidae includes cuckoos, roadrunners and anis. These birds are of variable size with slender bodies, long tails and strong legs. The Old World cuckoos are brood parasites.

Common name	Binomial name	Status in the country	Global status	Trend	Notes	Image
Great spotted cuckoo	Clamator glandarius	R	Least concern	Steady	Scarce disperser	
Asian koel	Eudynamys scolopaceus	A	Least concern	Steady	Vagrant, single record	
Common cuckoo	Cuculus canorus	N	Least concern	▼	Passage migrant	

== Nightjars and allies ==
Order: Caprimulgiformes Family: Caprimulgidae

Nightjars are medium-sized nocturnal birds that usually nest on the ground. They have long wings, short legs and very short bills. Most have small feet, of little use for walking, and long pointed wings. Their soft plumage is camouflaged to resemble bark or leaves.

Common name	Binomial name	Status in the country	Global Status	Trend	Notes	Image
Eurasian nightjar	Caprimulgus europaeus	N	Least concern	▼	Passage migrant	
Egyptian nightjar	Caprimulgus aegyptius	R	Least concern	▼	Rare passage migrant	

== Swifts ==
Order: Caprimulgiformes Family: Apodidae

Swifts are small birds which spend the majority of their lives flying. These birds have very short legs and never settle voluntarily on the ground, perching instead only on vertical surfaces. Many swifts have long swept-back wings which resemble a crescent or boomerang.

Common name	Binomial name	Status in the country	Global status	Trend	Notes	Image
Alpine swift	Tachymarptis melba	R	Least concern	Steady	Rare passage migrant	
Common swift	Apus apus	N	Least concern	Steady	Uncommon winter visitor	
Pallid swift	Apus pallidus	N	Least concern	Steady	Winter visitor	
Little swift	Apus affinis	A	Least concern	▲	Vagrant	

== Rails, gallinules, and coots ==
Order: Gruiformes Family: Rallidae

Rallidae is a large family of small to medium-sized birds which includes the rails, crakes, coots and gallinules. Typically they inhabit dense vegetation in damp environments near lakes, swamps or rivers. In general they are shy and secretive birds, making them difficult to observe. Most species have strong legs and long toes which are well adapted to soft uneven surfaces. They tend to have short, rounded wings and to be weak fliers.

Common name	Binomial name	Status in the country	Global status	Trend	Notes	Image
Water rail	Rallus aquaticus	R	Least concern	▼	Winter visitor	
Corncrake	Crex crex	R	Least concern	Steady	Rare passage migrant	
Spotted crake	Porzana porzana	N	Least concern	Steady	Uncommon passage migrant	
Common moorhen	Gallinula chloropus	N	Least concern	Steady	Common	
Eurasian coot	Fulica atra	N	Least concern	▲	Resident and winter visitor	
Grey-headed swamphen	Porphyrio poliocephalus	N	Not recognised by the IUCN	?	Resident breeder	
White-breasted waterhen	Amaurornis phoenicurus	A	Least concern	?	Vagrant	
Little crake	Porzana parva	N	Least concern	Steady	Uncommon migrant	
Baillon's crake	Zapornia pusilla	N	Least concern	?	Uncommon migrant	

== Cranes ==
Order: Gruiformes Family: Gruidae

Cranes are large, long-legged and long-necked birds. Unlike the similar-looking but unrelated herons, cranes fly with necks outstretched, not pulled back. Most have elaborate and noisy courting displays or "dances".

Common name	Binomial name	Status in the country	Global status	Trend	Notes	Image
Common crane	Grus grus	A	Least concern	▲	Vagrant	
Demoiselle crane	Grus virgo	A	Least concern	▲	Vagrant	

== Stone-curlews ==
Order: Charadriiformes Family: Burhinidae

The stone-curlews and thick-knees are a group of largely tropical waders in the family Burhinidae. They are found worldwide within the tropical zone, with some species also breeding in temperate Europe and Australia. They are medium to large waders with strong black or yellow-black bills, large yellow eyes and cryptic plumage. Despite being classed as waders, most species have a preference for arid or semi-arid habitats.

Common name	Binomial name	Status in the country	Global status	Trend	Notes	Image
Eurasian stone-curlew	Burhinus oedicnemus	N	Least concern	▼	Passage migrant and overwintering	

== Stilts and avocets ==
Order: Charadriiformes Family: Recurvirostridae

Recurvirostridae is a family of large wading birds, which includes the avocets and stilts. The avocets have long legs and long up-curved bills. The stilts have extremely long legs and long, thin, straight bills.

Common name	Binomial name	Status in the country	Global status	Trend	Notes	Image
Black-winged stilt	Himantopus himantopus	N	Least concern	▲	Migrant and breeder	
Pied avocet	Recurvirostra avosetta	N	Least concern	?	Common winter visitor	

== Oystercatchers ==
Order: Charadriiformes Family: Haematopodidae

The oystercatchers are large and noisy plover-like birds, with strong bills used for smashing or prising open molluscs.

Common name	Binomial name	Status in the country	Global Status	Trend	Notes	Image
Eurasian oystercatcher	Haematopus ostralegus	N	Near threatened	▼	Passage migrant	

== Plovers and lapwings ==
Order: Charadriiformes Family: Charadriidae

The family Charadriidae includes the plovers, dotterels and lapwings. They are small to medium-sized birds with compact bodies, short, thick necks and long, usually pointed, wings. They are found in open country worldwide, mostly in habitats near water.

Common name	Binomial name	Status in the country	Global status	Trend	Frequency	Image
Grey plover	Pluvialis squatarola	N	Least concern	▼	Common, found on coasts and shores	
European golden plover	Pluvialis apricaria	R	Least concern	▲	Few annual records	
Pacific golden plover	Pluvialis fulva	N	Least concern	▼	Winter visitor and passage migrant	
Northern lapwing	Vanellus vanellus	N	Near threatened	▼	Winter visitor	
Spur-winged lapwing	Vanellus spinosus	?	Least concern	▲	Uncertain	
Red-wattled lapwing	Vanellus indicus	N	Least concern	?	Migrant and breeding resident	
Sociable lapwing	Vanellus gregarius	R	Critically endangered	▼	Considered a vagrant, though it seems to frequent some farms and reserves	
White-tailed lapwing	Vanellus leucurus	R	Least concern	?	Winter visitor	
Lesser sand plover	Charadrius mongolus	N	Least concern	?	Common year-round	
Greater sand plover	Charadrius leschenaultii	N	Least concern	▼	Common year-round	
Caspian plover	Charadrius asiaticus	N	Least concern	▼	Scarce passage migrant	
Kentish plover	Charadrius alexandrinus	N	Least concern	▼	Resident breeder	
Common ringed plover	Charadrius hiaticula	N	Least concern	▼	Common year-round	
Little ringed plover	Charadrius dubius	N	Least concern	?	Breeding, leaves the country in winter	
Eurasian dotterel	Charadrius morinellus	N	Least concern	▼	Scarce and elusive winter visitor	

== Sandpipers and allies ==
Order: Charadriiformes Family: Scolopacidae

Scolopacidae is a large diverse family of small to medium-sized shorebirds including the sandpipers, curlews, godwits, shanks, tattlers, woodcocks, snipes, dowitchers and phalaropes. The majority of these species eat small invertebrates picked out of the mud or soil. Variation in length of legs and bills enables multiple species to feed in the same habitat, particularly on the coast, without direct competition for food.

Common name	Binomial name	Status in the country	Global status	Trend	Frequency	Image
Eurasian curlew	Numenius arquata	N	Near threatened	▼	Winter visitor	
Eurasian whimbrel	Numenius phaeopus	N	Least concern	▼	Passage migrant	
Little curlew	Numenius minutus	A	Least concern	Steady	Single vagrant record in 2007	
Slender-billed curlew	Numenius tenuirostris	X	Critically endangered	▼	Few records of this species have been obtained in recent times, and it is feared extinct	
Bar-tailed godwit	Limosa lapponica	N	Near threatened	▼	Passage migrant and winter visitor	
Black-tailed godwit	Limosa limosa	N	Near threatened	▼	Passage migrant and winter visitor	
Ruddy turnstone	Arenaria interpres	N	Least concern	▼	Passage migrant and winter visitor	
Great knot	Calidris tenuirostris	R	Endangered	▼	Rare migrant	
Red knot	Calidris canutus	A	Near threatened	▼	Vagrant with 9 records	
Ruff	Calidris pugnax	N	Least concern	▼	Common	
Broad-billed sandpiper	Calidris falcinellus	N	Least concern	▼	Passage migrant	
Curlew sandpiper	Calidris ferruginea	N	Near threatened	▼	Passage migrant and visitor in late winter	
Temminck's stint	Calidris temminckii	N	Least concern	?	Passage migrant and winter visitor; common on shores and rocky coasts	
Sanderling	Calidris alba	N	Least concern	?	Passage migrant and winter visitor	
Dunlin	Calidris alpina	N	Least concern	▼	Winter visitor	
Purple sandpiper	Calidris maritima	A	Least concern	▼	Vagrant	
Little stint	Calidris minuta	N	Least concern	▲	Winter visitor	
Pectoral sandpiper	Calidris melatonos	A	Least concern	Steady	Single vagrant record in 2011	
Jack snipe	Lymnocryptes minimus	N	Least concern	Steady	Scarce and elusive winter visitor	
Eurasian woodcock	Scolopax rusticola	A	Least concern	Steady	Rare winter visitor	
Common snipe	Gallinago gallinago	N	Least concern	▼	Passage migrant and winter visitor	
Great snipe	Gallinago media	R	Near threatened	▼	Rare passage migrant	
Pin-tailed snipe	Gallinago stenura	A	Least concern	?	Vagrant	
Terek sandpiper	Xenus cinereus	N	Least concern	▼	Resident	
Red-necked phalarope	Phalaropus lobatus	N	Least concern	▼	Scarce passage migrant	
Red phalarope	Phalaropus fulicarius	A	Least concern	▼	Rare winter visitor	
Common sandpiper	Actitis hypoleucos	N	Least concern	▼	Very common throughout winter and late summer	
Green sandpiper	Tringa ochropus	N	Least concern	▲	Relatively common throughout winter and spring	
Spotted redshank	Tringa erythropus	N	Least concern	Steady	Common winter visitor and passage migrant	
Common greenshank	Tringa nebularia	N	Least concern	Steady	Common winter visitor and passage migrant	
Marsh sandpiper	Tringa stagnatilis	N	Least concern	▼	Somewhat common winter visitor and passage migrant	
Wood sandpiper	Tringa glareola	N	Least concern	Steady	Common winter visitor and passage migrant	
Common redshank	Tringa totanus	N	Least concern	?	Winter visitor and passage migrant	

== Crab plover ==
Order: Charadriiformes Family: Dromadidae

The crab plover is related to the waders. It resembles a plover but with very long grey legs and a strong heavy black bill similar to a tern. It has black-and-white plumage, a long neck, partially webbed feet and a bill designed for eating crabs.

Common name	Binomial name	Status in the country	Global Status	Trend	Notes	Image
Crab-plover	Dromas ardeola	N	Least concern	Steady	Migrant and breeder	

== Pratincoles and coursers ==
Order: Charadriiformes Family: Glareolidae

Glareolidae is a family of wading birds comprising the pratincoles, which have short legs, long pointed wings and long forked tails, and the coursers, which have long legs, short wings and long, pointed bills which curve downwards.

Common name	Binomial name	Status in the country	Global status	Trend	Notes	Image
Cream-coloured courser	Cursorius cursor	N	Least concern	▼	Scarce resident and common migrant	
Collared pratincole	Glareola pratincola	N	Least concern	▼	Passage migrant	
Oriental pratincole	Glareola maldivarum	A	Least concern	▼	Single vagrant record in 2008	
Black-winged pratincole	Glareola nordmanni	N	Near threatened	▼	Passage migrant	

== Skuas and jaegers ==
Order: Charadriiformes Family: Stercorariidae

The family Stercorariidae are, in general, medium to large birds, typically with grey or brown plumage, often with white markings on the wings. They nest on the ground in temperate and arctic regions and are long-distance migrants.

Common name	Binomial name	Status in the country	Global status	Trend	Notes	Image
Pomarine skua	Stercorarius pomarinus	N	Least concern	Steady	Summer visitor	
Arctic skua	Stercorarius parasiticus	N	Least concern	Steady	Summer visitor	
Long-tailed skua	Stercorarius longicaudus	A	Least concern	Steady	Vagrant with 3 records	

== Gulls, terns, and skimmers ==
Order: Charadriiformes Family: Laridae

Laridae is a family of medium to large seabirds, the gulls, terns and kittiwakes. Gulls are typically grey or white, often with black markings on the head or wings. They have stout, longish bills and webbed feet. Terns are a group of generally medium to large seabirds typically with grey or white plumage, often with black markings on the head. Most terns hunt fish by diving but some pick insects off the surface of fresh water. Both groups are generally long-lived birds, with several species known to live in excess of 30 years.

Common name	Binomial name	Status in the country	Global status	Trend	Notes	Image
Black-legged kittiwake	Rissa tridactyla	A	Vulnerable	▼	Vagrant	
Sabine's gull	Xema sabini	A	Least concern	Steady	Vagrant recorded in 2016	
Slender-billed gull	Chroicocephalus genei	N	Least concern	?	Abundant winter visitor	
Black-headed gull	Chroicocephalus ridibundus	N	Least concern	?	Common winter visitor	
Brown-headed gull	Chroicocephalus brunnicephalua	A	Least concern	Steady	Vagrant	
Little gull	Hydrocoloeus minutus	A	Least concern	▲	Vagrant	
Franklin's gull	Leucophaeus pipixan	A	Least concern	▲	Vagrant	
Mediterranean gull	Larus melanocephalus	A	Least concern	▼	Vagrant often recorded during passage migration seasons	
White-eyed gull	Larus leucophthalmus	A	Least concern	Steady	Vagrant recorded once in 2018	
Pallas's gull	Larus ichthyaetus	N	Least concern	▲	Overwintering species	
Common gull	Larus canus	R	Least concern	?	Rare winter visitor	
Caspian gull	Larus cachinnans	N	Least concern	▲	Overwintering species	
Armenian gull	Larus armenicus	R	Least concern	▲	Rare visitor during winter months	
Lesser black-backed gull	Larus fuscus	N	Least concern	▲	Overwintering species	
Bridled tern	Onychoprion anaethetus	N	Least concern	?	Breeder and passage migrant	
Little tern	Sternula albifrons	N	Least concern	▼	Passage migrant	
Saunders's tern	Sternula saundersi	N	Least concern	▼	Migrant and breeder	
Gull-billed tern	Gelocheilodon nilotica	N	Least concern	▼	Overwintering species	
Caspian tern	Hydroprogne caspia	N	Least concern	▲	Resident breeder	
White-winged tern	Chlidonias niger	A	Least concern	Steady	Passage migrant	
Black tern	Chlidonias leucopterus	N	Least concern	▼	Vagrant with several records	
Whiskered tern	Chlidonias hybrida	N	Least concern	Steady	Common	
Common tern	Sterna hirundo	N	Least concern	?	Uncommon passage migrant	
Arctic tern	Sterna paradisaea	A	Least concern	▼	Vagrant recorded occasionally at Al Jahra bay	
White-cheeked tern	Sterna repressa	N	Least concern	▼	Common	
Great crested tern	Thalasseus bergii	N	Least concern	Steady	Passage migrant	
Sandwich tern	Thalasseus sandvicensis	N	Least concern	Steady	Winter visitor	
Lesser crested tern	Thalasseus bengalensis	N	Least concern	Steady	Common	

== Tropicbirds ==
Order: Phaethontiformes Family: Phaethontidae

Tropicbirds are slender white birds of tropical oceans, with exceptionally long central tail feathers. Their heads and long wings have black markings.

Common name	Binomial name	Status in the country	Global status	Trend	Notes	Image
Red-billed tropicbird	Phaethon aethereus	A	Least concern	▼	Vagrant, last seen almost 50 years ago	

== Divers and loons ==
Order: Gaviiformes Family: Gaviidae

Divers, known as loons in North America, are a group of aquatic birds found in many parts of northern Eurasia and North America. They are the size of a large duck or small goose, which they somewhat resemble when swimming, but to which they are completely unrelated.

Common name	Binomial name	Status in the country	Global status	Trend	Notes	Image
Black-throated diver	Gavia arctica	A	Least concern	▼	Vagrant	

== Shearwaters and petrels ==
Order: Procellariiformes Family: Procellariidae

The procellariids are the main group of medium-sized shearwaters and petrels, characterised by united nostrils with medium septum and a long outer functional primary.

Common name	Binomial name	Status in the country	Global status	Trend	Notes	Image
Jouanin's petrel	Bulweria fallax	A	Near threatened	▼	Vagrant with one record	
Sooty shearwater	Ardenna grisea	A	Near threatened	▼	Vagrant with 4 records	
Short-tailed shearwater	Ardenna tenuirostris	A	Least concern	▼	Vagrant	
Tropical shearwater	Puffinus bailloni	A	Least concern	Steady	Vagrant	
Persian shearwater	Puffinus persicus	A	Least concern	Steady	One record of about 25 birds in 1957, may be more abundant as the offshore waters of the nation are not frequented by birdwatchers	

== Storks ==
Order: Ciconiiformes Family: Ciconiidae

Storks are large, long-legged, long-necked, wading birds with long, stout bills. Storks are mute, but bill-clattering is an important mode of communication at the nest. Their nests can be large and may be reused for many years. Many species are migratory.

Common name	Binomial name	Status in the country	Global status	Trend	Notes	Image
White stork	Ciconia ciconia	N	Least concern	▲	Uncommon passage migrant	
Black stork	Ciconia nigra	A	Least concern	?	Rare visitor in late spring	

== Cormorants and shags ==
Order: Suliformes Family: Phalacrocoracidae

Phalacrocoracidae is a family of medium to large coastal, fish-eating seabirds that includes cormorants and shags. Plumage colouration varies, with the majority having mainly dark plumage, some species being black-and-white and a few being colourful.

Common name	Binomial name	Status in the country	Global status	Trend	Notes	Image
Great cormorant	Phalacrocorax carbo	N	Least concern	▲	Common throughout winter	
Socotra cormorant	Phalacrocorax nigrogularis	E	Vulnerable	▼	Endemic to the region	

== Frigatebirds ==
Order: Suliformes Family: Fregatidae

Frigatebirds are large seabirds usually found over tropical oceans. They are large, black-and-white or completely black, with long wings and deeply forked tails. The males have a red inflatable throat pouch. They do not swim or walk and cannot take off from a flat surface. Having the largest wingspan-to-body-weight ratio of any bird, they are essentially aerial, able to stay aloft for more than a week.

Common name	Binomial name	Status in the country	Global status	Trend	Notes	Image
Lesser frigatebird	Fregata ariel	A	Least concern	▼	Recorded once in 2008	

== Boobies and gannets ==
Order: Suliformes Family: Sulidae

The sulids comprise the gannets and boobies. Both groups are medium to large coastal seabirds that plunge-dive for fish.

Common name	Binomial name	Status in the country	Global status	Trend	Notes	Image
Masked booby	Sula dactylatra	A	Least concern	▼	Vagrant with 2 records	
Brown booby	Sula leucogaster	A	Least concern	▼	Vagrant	

== Anhingas ==
Order: Suliformes Family: Anhingidae

Anhingas or darters are often called "snake-birds" because of their long thin neck, which gives a snake-like appearance when they swim with their bodies submerged. The males have black and dark-brown plumage, an erectile crest on the nape and a larger bill than the female. The females have much paler plumage especially on the neck and underparts. The darters have completely webbed feet and their legs are short and set far back on the body. Their plumage is somewhat permeable, like that of cormorants, and they spread their wings to dry after diving.

Common name	Binomial name	Status in the country	Global status	Trend	Notes	Image
African darter	Anhinga rufa	A	Least concern	▼	Vagrant, a single record of a pair in 2009	

== Pelicans ==
Order: Pelecaniformes Family: Pelecanidae

Pelicans are large water birds with a distinctive pouch under their beak. As with other members of the order Pelecaniformes, they have webbed feet with four toes.

Common name	Binomial name	Status in the country	Global status	Trend	Notes	Image
Great white pelican	Pelecanus onocrotalus	R	Least concern	?	Scarce disperser, recorded occasionally around Jahra bay	
Dalmatian pelican	Pelecanus crispus	R	Near threatened	▼	Vagrant to the mainland, though it breeds on Bubyan Island	

== Herons, egrets, and bitterns ==
Order: Pelecaniformes Family: Ardeidae

The family Ardeidae contains the bitterns, herons and egrets. Herons and egrets are medium to large wading birds with long necks and legs. Bitterns tend to be shorter necked and more wary. Members of Ardeidae fly with their necks retracted, unlike other long-necked birds such as storks, ibises and spoonbills.

Common name	Binomial name	Status in the country	Global status	Trend	Notes	Image
Great bittern	Botaurus stellaris	R	Least concern	▼	Rare winter visitor	
Little bittern	Ixobrychus minutus	N	Least concern	▼	Passage migrant	
Grey heron	Ardea cinerea	N	Least concern	?	Resident and migrant	
Purple heron	Ardea purpurea	N	Least concern	▼	Resident and migrant	
Great egret	Egretta alba	N	Least concern	?	Overwintering	
Little egret	Egretta garzetta	N	Least concern	▲	Winter visitor	
Western reef heron	Egretta gularis	N	Least concern	Steady	Uncommon resident, abundant winter visitor	
Cattle egret	Bubulcus ibis	N	Least concern	▲	Passage migrant and winter visitor	
Squacco heron	Ardeola ralloides	N	Least concern	?	Passage migrant	
Indian pond heron	Ardeola grayii	A	Least concern	?	Vagrant	
Striated heron	Butroides striata	A	Least concern	▼	Vagrant	
Black-crowned night heron	Nycticorax nycticorax	N	Least concern	▼	Winter visitor	

== Ibises and spoonbills ==
Order: Pelecaniformes Family: Threskiornithidae

Threskiornithidae is a family of large terrestrial and wading birds which includes the ibises and spoonbills. They have long, broad wings with 11 primary and about 20 secondary feathers. They are strong fliers and, despite their size and weight, very capable soarers.

Common name	Binomial name	Status in the country	Global status	Trend	Notes	Image
Glossy ibis	Plegadis falcinellus	N	Least concern	▼	Overwintering species	
African sacred ibis	Threskiornis aethiopicus	A	Least concern	Steady	Vagrant with 2 records	
Eurasian spoonbill	Platalea leucorodia	R	Least concern	?	Rare migrant	

== Osprey ==
Order: Accipitriformes Family: Pandionidae

The family Pandionidae contains only one species, the osprey. The osprey is a medium-large raptor which is a specialist fish-eater with a worldwide distribution.

Common name	Binomial name	Status in the country	Global status	Trend	Frequency	Image
Osprey	Pandion haliaetus	N	Least concern	▲	Resident	

== Hawks, eagles, and kites ==
Order: Accipitriformes Family: Accipitridae

Accipitridae is a family of birds of prey, which includes hawks, eagles, kites, harriers and Old World vultures. These birds have powerful hooked beaks for tearing flesh from their prey, strong legs, powerful talons and keen eyesight.

Common name	Binomial name	Status in the country	Global status	Trend	Notes	Image
Black-winged kite	Elanus caeruleus	R	Least concern	Steady	Scarce disperser	
Egyptian vulture	Neophron percnopterus	R	Endangered	▼	Rare passage migrant	
European honey buzzard	Pernis apivorus	R	Least concern	Steady	Rare passage migrant	
Crested honey buzzard	Pernis ptilorhynchus	N	Least concern	▼	Winter visitor	
Griffon vulture	Gyps fulvus	N	Least concern	▲	Scarce winter migrant	
Eurasian black vulture	Aegypius monachus	R	Near threatened	▼	Scarce winter visitor	
Lappet-faced vulture	Torgos tracheliotos	A	Endangered	▼	Single vagrant recorded in 2008	
Short-toed snake eagle	Circaetus gallicus	N	Least concern	Steady	Scarce passage migrant and winter visitor	
Great spotted eagle	Clanga clanga	N	Vulnerable	▼	Overwintering species. White spots are more prominent in juveniles, though they tend to fade into adulthood.	
Lesser spotted eagle	Clanga pomarina	R	Least concern	Steady	Rare passage migrant	
Booted eagle	Hieraaetus pennatus	N	Least concern	Steady	Scarce passage migrant	
Golden eagle	Aquila chrysaetos	A	Least concern	Steady	Vagrant	
Steppe eagle	Aquila nipalensis	N	Endangered	▼	Passage migrant	
Eastern imperial eagle	Aquila heliaca	R	Vulnerable	▼	Rare overwintering species	
Bonelli's eagle	Aquila fasciata	A	Least concern	▼	Rare autumn disperser	
Western marsh harrier	Circus aeruginosus	N	Least concern	Steady	Winter visitor	
Hen harrier	Circus cyaneus	R	Least concern	▼	Scarce winter visitor	
Pallid harrier	Circus macrourus	N	Near threatened	▼	Winter visitor	
Montagu's harrier	Circus pygargus	N	Least concern	▼	Scarce passage migrant and winter visitor	
Shikra	Accipiter badius	N	Least concern	Steady	Uncommon winter visitor	
Levant sparrowhawk	Accipiter brevipes	A	Least concern	Steady	Vagrant	
Eurasian sparrowhawk	Accipiter nisus	R	Least concern	Steady	Scarce winter visitor	
Northern goshawk	Accipiter gentilis	A	Least concern	?	Vagrant	
Black kite	Milvus migrans	N	Least concern	Steady	Very common overwintering species	
White-tailed eagle	Haliaeetus albicilla	A	Least concern	▲	Rare winter visitor	
Common buzzard	Buteo buteo	N	Least concern	▲	Common passage migrant	
Long-legged buzzard	Buteo rufinus	A	Least concern	Steady	Frequent winter visitor	

== Barn owls ==
Order: Strigiformes Family: Tytonidae

Barn owls are medium to large owls with large heads and characteristic heart-shaped faces. They have long strong legs with powerful talons.

Common name	Binomial name	Status in the country	Global status	Trend	Notes	Image
Western barn owl	Tyto alba	N	Least concern	Steady	Scarce disperser	

== Owls ==
Order: Strigiformes Family: Strigidae

The typical owls are small to large solitary nocturnal birds of prey. They have large forward-facing eyes and ears, a hawk-like beak and a conspicuous circle of feathers around each eye called a facial disk.

Common name	Binomial name	Status in the country	Global status	Trend	Notes	Image
Eurasian scops owl	Otus scops	N	Least concern	▼	Uncommon passage migrant. Recognised by its large ear tufts, it is rarely seen at day. The plumage may vary.	
Pallid scops owl	Otus brucei	A	Least concern	Steady	Vagrant	
Pharaoh eagle owl	Bubo ascalaphus	N	Least concern	Steady	Uncommon resident	
Little owl	Athene noctua	N	Least concern	Steady	Resident	
Long-eared owl	Asio otus	A	Least concern	▼	Vagrant	
Short-eared owl	Asio flammeus	R	Least concern	▼	Rare winter visitor	

== Hoopoes ==
Order: Bucerotiformes Family: Upupidae

Hoopoes have black, white and orangey-pink colouring with a large erectile crest on their heads.

Common name	Binomial name	Status in the country	Global status	Trend	Notes	Image
Eurasian hoopoe	Upupa epops	N	Least concern	▼	Autumn and spring migrant	

== Kingfishers ==
Order: Coraciiformes Family: Alcedinidae

Kingfishers are medium-sized birds with large heads, long, pointed bills, short legs and stubby tails.

Common name	Binomial name	Status in the country	Global status	Trend	Notes	Image
Common kingfisher	Alcedo atthis	N	Least concern	?	Uncommon wintering species	
White-breasted kingfisher	Halcyon smyrnensis	N	Least concern	▲	Uncommon resident	
Pied kingfisher	Ceryle rudis	N	Least concern	?	Uncommon winter visitor	

== Bee-eaters ==
Order: Coraciiformes Family: Meropidae

The bee-eaters are a group of near passerine birds in the family Meropidae. Most species are found in Africa but others occur in southern Europe, Madagascar, Australia and New Guinea. They are characterised by richly coloured plumage, slender bodies and usually elongated central tail feathers. All are colourful and have long downturned bills and pointed wings, which give them a swallow-like appearance when seen from afar.

Common name	Binomial name	Status in the country	Global status	Trend	Notes	Image
European bee-eater	Merops apiaster	N	Least concern	Steady	Common passage migrant	
Blue-cheeked bee-eater	Merops persicus	N	Least concern	Steady	Common passage migrant	

== Rollers ==
Order: Coraciiformes Family: Coraciidae

Rollers resemble crows in size and build, but are more closely related to the kingfishers and bee-eaters. They share the colourful appearance of those groups with blues and browns predominating. The two inner front toes are connected, but the outer toe is not.

Common name	Binomial name	Status in the country	Global status	Trend	Notes	Image
European roller	Coracias garrulus	N	Least concern	▼	Passage migrant	
Indian roller	Coracias benghalensis	N	Near threatened	▼	Scarce disperser	

== Woodpeckers ==
Order: Piciformes Family: Picidae

Woodpeckers are small to medium-sized birds with chisel-like beaks, short legs, stiff tails and long tongues used for capturing insects. Some species have feet with two toes pointing forward and two backward, while several species have only three toes. Many woodpeckers have the habit of tapping noisily on tree trunks with their beaks.

Common name	Binomial name	Status in the country	Global status	Trend	Notes	Image
Eurasian wryneck	Jynx torquilla	N	Least concern	Steady	Passage migrant	

== Falcons and caracaras ==
Order: Falconiformes Family: Falconidae

Falconidae is a family of diurnal birds of prey. They differ from hawks, eagles and kites in that they kill with their beaks instead of their talons.

Common name	Binomial name	Status in the country	Global status	Trend	Notes	Image
Lesser kestrel	Falco naumanni	N	Least concern	Steady	Passage migrant	
Common kestrel	Falco tinnuculus	N	Least concern	▼	Common winter visitor	
Red-footed falcon	Falco vespertinus	A	Vulnerable	▼	Vagrant	
Amur falcon	Falco amurensis	A	Least concern	Steady	Vagrant	
Eleonora's falcon	Falco eleonorae	A	Least concern	▲	Vagrant recorded once in 2018	
Sooty falcon	Falco concolor	R	Vulnerable	▼	Rare summer visitor	
Merlin	Falco columbarius	R	Least concern	▼	Rare winter visitor	
Eurasian hobby	Falco subbuteo	N	Least concern	▼	Winter visitor	
Lanner falcon	Falco biarmicus	R	Least concern	▼	Scarce disperser in autumn and spring	
Saker falcon	Falco cherrug	R	Endangered	▼	Rare winter migrant	
Peregrine falcon	Falco peregrinus	R	Least concern	▲	Scarce disperser	

== Old World parrots ==
Order: Psittaciformes Family: Psittaculidae

Characteristic features of parrots include a strong curved bill, upright stance, strong legs, and clawed zygodactyl feet. Many parrots are vividly coloured, and some are multi-coloured. In size they range from 8 cm (3.1 in) to 1 m (3.3 ft) in length. Old World parrots are found from Africa east across south and southeast Asia and Oceania to Australia and New Zealand.

Common name	Binomial name	Status in the country	Global status	Trend	Notes	Image
Rose-ringed parakeet	Alexandrinus krameri	I	Least concern	▲	Introduced	

== Old World orioles ==
Order: Passeriformes Family: Oriolidae

The Old World orioles are colourful passerine birds. They are not related to the New World orioles.

Common name	Binomial name	Status in the country	Global status	Trend	Notes	Image
Eurasian golden oriole	Oriolus oriolus	N	Least concern	Steady	Late spring visitor	

== Drongos ==
Order: Passeriformes Family: Dicruridae

The drongos are mostly black or dark grey in colour, sometimes with metallic tints. They have long forked tails, and some Asian species have elaborate tail decorations. They have short legs and sit very upright when perched, like a shrike. They flycatch or take prey from the ground.

Common name	Binomial name	Status in the country	Global status	Trend	Notes	Image
Black drongo	Dicurus macrocercus	A	Least concern	?	Vagrant recorded once	
Ashy drongo	Dicurus leucophaeus	A	Least concern	?	Vagrant recorded thrice	

== Shrikes ==
Order: Passeriformes Family: Laniidae

Shrikes are passerine birds known for their habit of catching other birds and small animals and impaling the uneaten portions of their bodies on thorns. A typical shrike's beak is hooked, like a bird of prey.

Common name	Binomial name	Status in the country	Global status	Trend	Notes	Image
Red-backed shrike	Lanius collurio	N	Least concern	▼	Uncommon passage migrant and winter visitor	
Turkestan shrike	Lanius phoenicuroides	N	Least concern	Steady	Common winter migrant	
Isabelline shrike	Lanius isabellinus	N	Least concern	Steady	Common winter migrant	
Brown shrike	Lanius cristatus	A	Least concern	▼	Vagrant with one record	
Bay-backed shrike	Lanius vitattus	A	Least concern	Steady	Vagrant	
Long-tailed shrike	Lanius schach	A	Least concern	?	Vagrant	
Great grey shrike	Lanius excubitor • Lanius excubitor ssp. aucheri (Arabian grey shrike) • Lanius excubitor ssp. pallidirostris (Steppe grey shrike)	N	Least concern	▼	Overwintering species	
Lesser grey shrike	Lanius minor	N	Least concern	▼	Uncommon passage migrant	Lanîûs mînor
Masked shrike	Lanius nubicus	N	Least concern	▼	Passage migrant and winter visitor	
Woodchat shrike	Lanius senator	N	Near threatened	▼	Passage migrant	

== Crows, jays, and magpies ==
Order: Passeriformes Family: Corvidae

The family Corvidae includes crows, ravens, jays, choughs, magpies, treepies, nutcrackers and ground jays. Corvids are above average in size among the Passeriformes, and some of the larger species show high levels of intelligence.

Common name	Binomial name	Status in the country	Global status	Trend	Notes	Image
House crow	Corvus splendens	I	Least concern	Steady	Introduced	
Rook	Corvus frugilegus	A	Least concern	▼	Vagrant with 3 records	
Brown-necked raven	Corvus rufficolis	R	Least concern	▲	Scarce disperser	
Hooded crow	Corvus cornix	A	Not recognised by the IUCN	Steady	Vagrant with one record in 2012	

== Tits, chickadees, and titmice ==
Order: Passeriformes Family: Paridae

The Paridae are mainly small stocky woodland species with short stout bills. Some have crests. They are adaptable birds, with a mixed diet including seeds and insects.

Common name	Binomial name	Status in the country	Global status	Trend	Notes	Image
Sombre tit	Poecile lugubris	A	Least concern	Steady	Vagrant with a single record in 2009	
Great tit	Parus major	A	Least concern	▲	Vagrant with a single record in 2006	

== Penduline tits ==
Order: Passeriformes Family: Remizidae

The penduline tits are a group of small passerine birds related to the true tits. They are insectivores.

Common name	Binomial name	Status in the country	Global status	Trend	Notes	Image
Eurasian penduline tit	Remiz pendulinus	N	Least concern	▲	Uncommon winter visitor	

== Larks ==
Order: Passeriformes Family: Alaudidae

Larks are small terrestrial birds with often extravagant songs and display flights. Most larks are fairly dull in appearance. Their food is insects and seeds.

Common name	Binomial name	Status in the country	Global status	Trend	Notes	Image
Greater hoopoe-lark	Alaemon alaudipes	N	Least concern	▼	Resident	
Bar-tailed lark	Ammomanes cincturus	N	Least concern	▼	Resident breeder	
Desert lark	Ammomanes deserti	N	Least concern	▲	Resident	
Black-crowned sparrow lark	Eremopterix nigriceps	N	Least concern	▲	Resident	
Temminck's lark	Eremophila bilopha	N	Least concern	▼	Uncommon disperser	
Greater short-toed lark	Calandrella brachydactyla	N	Least concern	?	Winter visitor	
Bimaculated lark	Melanocorypha bimaculata	R	Least concern	Steady	Rare winter visitor	
Calandra lark	Melanocorypha calandra	A	Least concern	▼	Vagrant	
Arabian lark	Eremalauda eremodites	A	Least concern	Steady	Vagrant	
Turkestan short-toed lark	Eremalauda eremodites	N	Not recognised by the IUCN	▼	Uncommon in the country, this species is more likely to be encountered in open deserts. A new derivative, this species was considered conspecific with the lesser short-toed lark until 2020.	
Woodlark	Lullula arborea	A	Least concern	▲	Vagrant	
Eurasian skylark	Alauda arvensis	R	Least concern	▼	scarce winter visitor	
Oriental skylark	Alauda gulgula	R	Least concern	▼	Scarce winter visitor	
Crested lark	Galerdia cristata	N	Least concern	▼	Breeding resident	

== Cisticolas and allies ==
Order: Passeriformes Family: Cisticolidae

The Cisticolidae are warblers found mainly in warmer southern regions of the Old World. They are generally very small birds of drab brown or grey appearance found in open country such as grassland or scrub.

Common name	Binomial name	Status in the country	Global status	Trend	Frequency	Image
Graceful prinia	Prinia gracilis	N	Least concern	Steady	Winter visitor	
Delicate prinia	Prinia lepida	A	Not recognised by the IUCN	?	Taxonomy disputed; it is considered part of the graceful prinia species complex by several authorities	
Zitting cisticola	Cisticola juncidis	A	Least concern	Steady	Vagrant with 5 records	

== Laughingthrushes and allies ==
Order: Passeriformes Family: Leiothrichidae

The members of this family are diverse in size and colouration, though those of genus Turdoides tend to be brown or greyish. The family is found in Africa, India, and southeast Asia.

Common name	Binomial name	Status in the country	Global status	Trend	Frequency	Image
Afghan babbler	Argya huttoni	N	Not recognised by the IUCN	?	Scarce resident	
Arabian babbler	Argya squamiceps	A	Least concern	Steady	Vagrant	

== Reed warblers and allies ==
Order: Passeriformes Family: Acrocephalidae

The members of this family are usually rather large for "warblers". Most are rather plain olivaceous brown above with much yellow to beige below. They are usually found in open woodland, reedbeds, or tall grass. The family occurs mostly in southern to western Eurasia and surroundings, but it also ranges far into the Pacific, with some species in Africa.

Common name	Binomial name	Status in the country	Global status	Trend	Notes	Image
Booted warbler	Iduna caligata	A	Least concern	▲	Vagrant	
Syke's warbler	Iduna rama	A	Least concern	Steady	Vagrant	
Eastern olivaceous warbler	Iduna pallida	N	Least concern	Steady	Scarce passage migrant	
Upcher's warbler	Hippolais languida	N	Least concern	Steady	Winter visitor	
Olive-tree warbler	Hippolais olivetorun	A	Least concern	Steady	Vagrant recorded once in 1972	
Icterine warbler	Hippolais icterina	N	Least concern	▼	Vagrant	
Moustached warbler	Acrocephalus melanopogon	A	Least concern	Steady	Vagrant	Moustached Warbler Acrocephalus melanopogon by Dr. Raju Kasambe (2)
Sedge warbler	Acrocephalus schoenobaenus	N	Least concern	Steady	Rare passage migrant	
Paddyfield warbler	Acrocephalus agricola	A	Least concern	▼	Vagrant	
Blyth's reed warbler	Acrocephalus dumetorum	A	Least concern	▲	Vagrant with 3 records	
Marsh warbler	Acrocephalus palustris	R	Least concern	Steady	Rare passage migrant	
Eurasian reed warbler	Acrocephalus scirpaceus	N	Least concern	Steady	Uncommon	
Basra reed warbler	Eremalauda eremodites	E	Endangered	Steady	Endemic breeding species	
Great reed warbler	Acrocephalus arundinaceus	N	Least concern	▼	Uncommon winter visitor	
Oriental reed warbler	Acrocephalus orientalis	A	Least concern	▼	Vagrant	
Clamorous reed warbler	Acrocephalus stentoreus	N	Least concern	Steady	Winter visitor	

== Grassbirds and allies ==
Order: Passeriformes Family: Locustellidae

Locustellidae are a family of small insectivorous songbirds found mainly in Eurasia, Africa, and the Australian region. They are smallish birds with tails that are usually long and pointed, and tend to be drab brownish or buffy all over.

Common name	Binomial name	Status in the country	Global Status	Trend	Notes	Image
River warbler	Locustella fluviatilis	A	Least concern	▼	Vagrant	
Savi's warbler	Locustella luscinioides	N	Least concern	Steady	Winter visitor	
Common grasshopper warbler	Locustella naevia	N	Least concern	Steady	Winter visitor	

== Swallows ==
Order: Passeriformes Family: Hirundinidae

The family Hirundinidae is adapted to aerial feeding. They have a slender streamlined body, long pointed wings and a short bill with a wide gape. The feet are adapted to perching rather than walking, and the front toes are partially joined at the base.

Common name	Binomial name	Status in the country	Global status	Trend	Notes	Image
Sand martin	Riparia riparia	N	Least concern	Steady	Common in both late summer and winter	
Brown-throated martin	Riparia paludicola	A	Least concern	▼	Vagrant	
Grey-throated martin	Riparia chinensis	A	Least concern	▼	Vagrant	
Pale sand martin	Riparia diluta	A	Least concern	?	Vagrant	
Eurasian crag martin	Ptyonoprogne rupestris	R	Least concern	Steady	Rare winter visitor	
Pale crag martin	Ptyonoprogne fuligula	A	Least concern	Steady	Vagrant, 8 records	
Barn swallow	Hirundo rustica	N	Least concern	▼	Frequent and abundant passage migrant	
Eastern red-rumped swallow	Cecropis daurica	N	Least concern	Steady	Vagrant	
European red-rumped swallow	Cecropis rufula	N	Least concern	Steady	Passage migrant	
Streak-throated swallow	Pterocheliodon fluvicola	A	Least concern	▲	Vagrant	
Common house martin	Delichon urbicum	N	Least concern	▼	Uncommon	

== Bulbuls ==
Order: Passeriformes Family: Pycnonotidae

Bulbuls are medium-sized songbirds. Some are colourful with yellow, red or orange vents, cheeks, throats or supercilia, but most are drab, with uniform olive-brown to black plumage. Some species have distinct crests.

Common name	Binomial name	Status in the country	Global status	Trend	Notes	Image
Red-vented bulbul	Pycnonotus cafer	I	Least concern	▲	Introduced resident	
White-eared bulbul	Pycnonotus leucotis	N	Least concern	▼	Common	

== Leaf warblers ==
Order: Passeriformes Family: Phylloscopidae

Leaf warblers are a family of small insectivorous birds found mostly in Eurasia and ranging into Wallacea and Africa. The species are of various sizes, often green-plumaged above and yellow below, or more subdued with greyish-green to greyish-brown colours.

Common name	Binomial name	Status in the country	Global status	Trend	Notes	Image
Wood warbler	Phylloscopus sibilatrix	A	Least concern	▼	Vagrant	
Eastern Bonelli's Warbler	Phylloscopus orientalis	A	Least concern	▲	Vagrant	
Yellow-browed warbler	Phylloscopus inornatus	A	Least concern	Steady	Vagrant	
Hume's warbler	Phylloscopus humei	A	Least concern	Steady	Vagrant	
Radde's Warbler	Phylloscopus schwarzi	A	Least concern	Steady	Vagrant	
Plain leaf warbler	Phylloscopus neglectus	A	Least concern	Steady	Vagrant	
Mountain chiffchaff	Phylloscopus sindianus	A	Least concern	▲	Vagrant	
Willow warbler	Phylloscopus trochilus	N	Least concern	▼	Common in spring and autumn	
Common chiffchaff	Phylloscopus collybita	N	Least concern	▲	Like the willow warbler, but more common in the winter	
Green warbler	Phylloscopus nitidus	A	Least concern	Steady	Vagrant	
Greenish warbler	Phylloscopus trochiloides	A	Least concern	▲	Vagrant	

== Sylviid warblers and allies ==
Order: Passeriformes Family: Sylviidae

The family Sylviidae is a group of small insectivorous passerine birds. They mainly occur as breeding species, as the common name implies, in Europe, Asia and, to a lesser extent, Africa. Most are of generally undistinguished appearance, but many have distinctive songs.

Common name	Binomial name	Status in the country	Global status	Trend	Notes	Image
Eurasian blackcap	Sylvia atricapilla	N	Least concern	▲	Passage migrant	
Garden warbler	Sylvia borin	A	Least concern	▼	Vagrant	
Asian desert warbler	Curruca nana	N	Least concern	Steady	Common winter visitor	
Barred warbler	Curruca nisoria	N	Least concern	Steady	Uncommon passage migrant	
Lesser whitethroat	C. curruca	N	Least concern	Steady	Common during spring migration and winter	
Eastern Orphean warbler	Curruca crassirostris	N	Least concern	▲	Rare passage migrant	
Menetries's warbler	Curruca mystacea	N	Least concern	Steady	Passage migrant	
Common whitethroat	Curruca communis	N	Least concern	▲	Common migrant	

== Crests ==
Order: Passeriformes Family: Regulidae

The crests, also called kinglets in North America, are a small group of birds formerly included in the Old World warblers, but now family status because they are genetically well-separated from them.

Common name	Binomial name	Status in the country	Global status	Trend	Notes	Image
Goldcrest	Regulus regulus	A	Least concern	▼	Single vagrant recorded in 2013	

== Wrens ==
Order: Passeriformes Family: Troglodytidae

The wrens are mainly small and inconspicuous except for their loud songs. These birds have short wings and thin down-turned bills. Several species often hold their tails upright. All are insectivorous.

Common name	Binomial name	Status in the country	Global status	Trend	Notes	Image
Eurasian wren	Troglodytes troglodytes	A	Least concern	▲	Vagrant recorded twice	

== Starlings ==
Order: Passeriformes Family: Sturnidae

Starlings are small to medium-sized passerine birds. Their flight is strong and direct and they are very gregarious. Their preferred habitat is fairly open country. They eat insects and fruit. Plumage is typically dark with a metallic sheen.

Common name	Binomial name	Status in the country	Global status	Trend	Notes	Image
Common starling	Sturnus vulgaris	N	Least concern	▼	Migratory; winter visitor	
Rosy starling	Pastor roseus	N	Least concern	?	Scarce migrant	
Common myna	Acridotheres tristis	I	Least concern	▲	Introduced and established; extremely common throughout the country	
Bank myna	Acridotheres ginginianus	I	Least concern	▲	Scarce resident	

== Thrushes and allies ==
Order: Passeriformes Family: Turdidae

The thrushes are a group of passerine birds that occur mainly in the Old World. They are plump, soft plumaged, small to medium-sized insectivores and omnivores, often feeding on the ground. Many have attractive songs.

Common name	Binomial name	Status in the country	Global status	Trend	Notes	Image
Song thrush	Turdus philomelos	N	Least concern	▲	Overwintering	
Redwing	Turdus iliacus	N	Near threatened	▼	Rare winter visitor	
Common blackbird	Turdus merula	N	Least concern	▲	Scarce winter visitor	
Fieldfare	Turdus pilaris	N	Least concern	▼	Rare winter visitor	
Ring ouzel	Turdus torquatus	A	Least concern	Steady	Vagrant	
Black-throated thrush	Turdus atrogularis	A	Least concern	?	Vagrant	
Red-throated thrush	Turdus ruficollis	A	Least concern	?	Vagrant	
Dusky thrush	Turdus eunomus	A	Least concern	?	Vagrant	
Naumann's thrush	Turdus naumanii	N	Least concern	?	Vagrant	

== Old World flycatchers ==
Order: Passeriformes Family: Muscicapidae

Old World flycatchers are a large group of small passerine birds native to the Old World. They are mainly small arboreal insectivores. The appearance of these birds is highly varied, but they mostly have weak songs and harsh calls.

Common name	Binomial name	Status in the country	Global Status	Trend	Notes	Image
Black scrub robin	Cercotrichas podobe	R	Least concern	Steady	Rare winter visitor	
Rufous-tailed scrub robin	Cercotrichas galactotes	N	Least concern	Steady	Overwintering	
Spotted flycatcher	Muscicapa striata	N	Least concern	▼	Common passage migrant in spring and winter	
European robin	Erithacus rubecula	N	Least concern	▲	Winter migrant	
White-throated robin	Irania gutturalis	N	Least concern	Steady	Spring visitor	
Thrush nightingale	Luscinia luscinia	R	Least concern	Steady	Rare passage migrant	
Common nightingale	Luscinia megarhynchos	N	Least concern	Steady	Winter visitor	
Bluethroat	Luscinia svecica	N	Least concern	Steady	Common in winter	
Taiga flycatcher	Ficedula albicilla	A	Least concern	Steady	Vagrant	
Red-breasted flycatcher	Ficedula parva	N	Least concern	▲	Uncommon; mostly seen in autumn	
Semi-collared flycatcher	Ficedula semitorquata	R	Least concern	▼	Rare passage migrant	
Collared flycatcher	Ficedula albicollis	A	Least concern	▲	Vagrant	
Rufous-backed redstart	Phoenicurus erythronotus	R	Least concern	Steady	Rare passage migrant	
Common redstart	Phoenicurus phoenicurus	N	Least concern	▲	Spring visitor	
Black redstart	Phoenicurus ochruros	N	Least concern	▲	Passage migrant	
Blue rock thrush	Monticola solitarus	N	Least concern	Steady	Common passage migrant and uncommon winter visitor	
Common rock thrush	Monticola saxtalis	N	Least concern	▼	Common passage migrant	
Whinchat	Saxicola ruberta	N	Least concern	▼	Occasional passage migrant	
European stonechat	Saxicola rubicola	N	Recognised as a subspecies of the common stonechat by the IUCN. Thus, no status exists for this species.	Steady	Passage migrant	
Siberian stonechat	Saxicola maurus	N	Recognised as a subspecies of the common stonechat by the IUCN. Thus, no status exists for this species.	Steady	The Siberian stonechat is similar to the European stonechat; the most noticeable differences are its extent of white, which is more prevalent, as well as the colour of its underparts being reduced, and the rump and underwing colour and patterns.	
Pied bushchat	Saxicola caprata	A	Least concern	Steady	Vagrant	
Northern wheatear	Oenanthe oenanthe	N	Least concern	▼	Common passage migrant	
Isabelline wheatear	Oenanthe isabellina	N	Least concern	Steady	Very common throughout winter and spring	
Hooded wheatear	Oenanthe monacha	R	Least concern	Steady	Rare winter visitor	
Desert wheatear	Oenanthe deserti	N	Least concern	Steady	Winter visitor	
Pied wheatear	Oenanthe pleschanka	N	Least concern	Steady	Common winter visitor	
Pied wheatear	Oenanthe pleschanka	N	Least concern	Steady	Common visitor	
Variable wheatear	Oenanthe picata	A	Least concern	Steady	Vagrant	
Hume's wheatear	Oenanthe albonigra	A	Least concern	Steady	Vagrant	
White-crowned wheatear	Oenanthe albonigra	A	Least concern	Steady	Vagrant	
Finsch's wheatear	Oenanthe finschii	R	Least concern	Steady	Rare winter visitor	
Mourning wheatear	Oenanthe lugens	N	Least concern	Steady	Winter visitor	
Kurdish wheatear	Oenanthe xanthoprymna	N	Least concern	Steady	Scarce passage migrant	
Persian wheatear	Oenanthe chrysopygia	N	Least concern	Steady	Common winter visitor	

== Hypocolius ==
Order: Passeriformes Family: Hypocoliidae

The grey hypocolius is a small Middle Eastern bird with the shape and soft plumage of a waxwing, but longer-tailed. They are mainly a uniform grey colour, except the males have a black triangular mask around their eyes.

Common name	Binomial name	Status in the country	Global status	Trend	Notes	Image
Grey hypocolius	Hypocolius ampelinus	N	Least concern	?	Uncommon winter visitor	

== Sunbirds and spiderhunters ==
Order: Passeriformes Family: Nectariniidae

The sunbirds and spiderhunters are very small passerine birds which feed largely on nectar, although they will also take insects, especially when feeding young. Flight is fast and direct on their short wings. Most species can take nectar by hovering like a hummingbird, but usually perch to feed.

Common name	Binomial name	Status in the country	Global status	Trend	Notes	Image
Palestine sunbird	Cinnyris osea	A	Least concern	Steady	Vagrant	
Purple sunbird	Cinnyris asiaticus	A	Least concern	Steady	Vagrant	

== Weavers and allies ==
Order: Passeriformes Family: Ploceidae

The weavers are small passerine birds related to the finches. They are seed-eating birds with rounded conical bills. The males of many species are brightly coloured, usually in red or yellow and black; some species show variation in colour only in the breeding season.

Common name	Binomial name	Status in the country	Global status	Trend	Notes	Image
Streaked weaver	Ploceus manyar	I	Least concern	Steady	Introduced	
Black-breasted weaver	Ploceus benghalensis	I	Least concern	Steady	Introduced	

== Waxbills and allies ==
Order: Passeriformes Family: Estrildidae

The waxbills are small passerine birds of the Old World tropics and Australasia. They are gregarious and often colonial seed eaters with short thick but pointed bills. They are all similar in structure and habits, but have wide variation in plumage colours and patterns.

Common name	Binomial name	Status in the country	Global status	Trend	Notes	Image
Red avadavat	Amandava amandava	I	Least concern	?	Introduced	
Indian silverbill	Eudoice malabarica	I	Least concern	Steady	Introduced	

== Accentors ==
Order: Passeriformes Family: Prunellidae

The accentors are in the only bird family, Prunellidae, which is completely endemic to the Palearctic. They are small, fairly drab species superficially similar to sparrows.

Common name	Binomial name	Status in the country	Global status	Trend	Notes	Image
Radde's accentor	Prunella ocularis	A	Least concern	Steady	Vagrant with three records in 2012	
Black-throated accentor	Prunella atrogularis	A	Least concern	Steady	Single vagrant ringed in 1995	
Dunnock	Prunella modularis	A	Least concern	▼	Vagrant with 4 records	

== Old World sparrows ==
Order: Passeriformes Family: Passeridae

Old World sparrows are small passerine birds. In general, sparrows tend to be small, plump, brown or grey birds with short tails and short powerful beaks. Sparrows are seed eaters, but they also consume small insects.

Common name	Binomial name	Status in the country	Global status	Trend	Notes	Image
House sparrow	Passer domesticus	N	Least concern	▼	Common	
Spanish sparrow	Passer hispaniolensis	N	Least concern	▼	Resident breeder	
Dead Sea sparrow	Passer moabiticus	A	Least concern	▼	Vagrant recorded occasionally	
Yellow-throated sparrow	Gymnoris xanthocollis	A	Least concern	▼	Vagrant	
Pale rockfinch	Carpispiza brachydactyla	N	Least concern	Steady	Passage migrant	

== Wagtails and pipits ==
Order: Passeriformes Family: Motacillidae

Motacillidae is a family of small passerine birds with medium to long tails. They include the wagtails, longclaws and pipits. They are slender, ground feeding insectivores of open country.

Common name	Binomial name	Status in the country	Global status	Trend	Notes	Image
Forest wagtail	Dendronanthus indicus	A	Least concern	Steady	Winter visitor	
Grey wagtail	Motacilla cinerea	N	Least concern	Steady	Winter visitor	
Western yellow wagtail	Motacilla flava	N	Least concern	▼	Common passage migrant	
Citrine wagtail	Motacilla citreola	A	Least concern	▲	Uncommon	
White wagtail	Motacilla alba	N	Least concern	Steady	Very common migrant	
Richard's pipit	Anthus richardi	A	Least concern	Steady	Vagrant	
Blyth's pipit	Anthus godlewskii	A	Least concern	Steady	Vagrant	
Long-billed pipit	Anthus similis	N	Least concern	Steady	Winter visitor	
Tawny pipit	Anthus campestris	N	Least concern	Steady	Common winter visitor	
Meadow pipit	Anthus pratensis	N	Near threatened	▼	Uncommon winter visitor	
Tree pipit	Anthus trivialis	N	Least concern	▼	Scarce	
Red-throated pipit	Anthus cervinus	N	Least concern	Steady	Winter visitor	
Olive-backed pipit	Anthus hodgsonii	A	Least concern	Steady	Vagrant	
Water pipit	Anthus spinoletta	N	Least concern	Steady	Common in winter, this large pipit is easy to identify as it has black legs. It frequents wetlands, as suggested by its name.	
American pipit	Anthus rubescens	A	Least concern	▼	Vagrant	

== Finches, euphonias, and allies ==
Order: Passeriformes Family: Fringillidae

Finches are seed-eating passerine birds, that are small to moderately large and have a strong beak, usually conical and in some species very large. All have twelve tail feathers and nine primaries. These birds have a bouncing flight with alternating bouts of flapping and gliding on closed wings, and most sing well.

Common name	Binomial name	Status in the country	Global status	Trend	Notes	Image
Common chaffinch	Fringilla coelebs	A	Least concern	▲	Vagrant	
Brambling	Fringilla montifringilla	A	Least concern	▼	Vagrant	
Hawfinch	C. coccothraustes	A	Least concern	▲	Vagrant	
Common rosefinch	Carpodacus erythrinus	R	Least concern	▼	Rare passage migrant	
Trumpeter finch	Bucanetes githagineus	N	Least concern	Steady	Scarce resident	
Mongolian finch	Bucanetes mongolicus	A	Least concern	Steady	Vagrant	
Desert finch	Rhodospiza obsoleta	A	Least concern	Steady	Vagrant	
European greenfinch	Chloris chloris	A	Least concern	Steady	Vagrant	
Common linnet	Linaria cannabina	A	Least concern	Steady	Vagrant	
Eurasian siskin	Spinus spinus	A	Least concern	▼	Vagrant	

== Old World buntings ==
Order: Passeriformes Family: Emberizidae

The emberizids are a large family of passerine birds. They are seed-eating birds with distinctively shaped bills. Many emberizid species have distinctive head patterns.

Common name	Binomial name	Status in the country	Global status	Trend	Notes	Image
Corn bunting	Emberiza calandra	N	Least concern	▼	Winter visitor and uncommon breeder	
Black-headed bunting	Emberiza melanocephala	R	Least concern	?	Rare passage migrant	
Red-headed bunting	Emberiza brunniceps	A	Least concern	Steady	Vagrant	
Cinereous bunting	Emberiza cineracea	R	Near threatened	▼	Rare passage migrant	
Yellowhammer	Emberiza citrinella	A	Least concern	▼	Vagrant with 2 records	
Grey-necked bunting	Emberiza buchanani	A	Least concern	Steady	Vagrant	
Ortolan bunting	Emberiza hortulana	N	Least concern	▼	Overwintering species	
Rock bunting	Emberiza cia	A	Least concern	▼	Vagrant with 3 records	
Striolated bunting	Emberiza striolata	R	Least concern	▲	2 vagrant records in 2013	
Reed bunting	Emberiza schoeniclus	A	Least concern	▼	Vagrant	
Little bunting	Emberiza pusilla	A	Least concern	Steady	Vagrant with 15 records	
Rustic bunting	Emberiza rustica	A	Vulnerable	▼	Vagrant	

== See also ==
- List of birds
- Lists of birds by region
