= International rankings of Kuwait =

These are the international rankings of Kuwait

== International rankings ==
| Organization | Survey | Ranking |
|---|---|---|
| Institute for Economics and Peace | Global Peace Index | 40 out of 144 |
| World Intellectual Property Organization | Global Innovation Index, 2026 | 62 out of 139 |
