= List of World Heritage Sites in Kuwait =

The United Nations Educational, Scientific and Cultural Organization (UNESCO) World Heritage Sites are places of importance to cultural or natural heritage as described in the UNESCO World Heritage Convention, established in 1972. Cultural heritage consists of monuments (such as architectural works, monumental sculptures, or inscriptions), groups of buildings, and sites (including archaeological sites). Natural features (consisting of physical and biological formations), geological and physiographical formations (including habitats of threatened species of animals and plants), and natural sites which are important from the point of view of science, conservation, or natural beauty, are defined as natural heritage. The State of Kuwait accepted the convention on 6 June 2002. There are no World Heritage Sites in the country, but there are five on the tentative list. It has served on the World Heritage Committee three times: from 2003 to 2007, then from 2015 to 2019, and most recently from 2025 to 2029.

== Tentative list ==
UNESCO lists sites under ten criteria; each entry must meet at least one of the criteria. Criteria i through vi are cultural, and vii through x are natural. In addition to sites inscribed on the World Heritage List, member states can maintain a list of tentative sites that they may consider for nomination. Nominations for the World Heritage List are only accepted if the site was previously listed on the tentative list. As of 2025, Kuwait has listed five sites on the tentative list.

Tentative sites
Site	Image	Location (governorate)	Year listed	UNESCO criteria	Description
Sa'ad and Sae'ed Area in Failaka Island		Capital Governorate	2013	iii (cultural)	
Abraj Al-Kuwait		Capital Governorate	2014	i, ii (cultural)	
Sheikh Abdullah Al-Jabir Palace		Capital Governorate	2015	ii (cultural)	
Boubyan Island and Mubarak Al-Kabeer Marine Reserve (MAKMR)		Jahra Governorate	2017	ix, x (natural)	
Failaka Island: A Palimpsest of Human Civilizations		Capital Governorate	2025	iii, v, vi (cultural)	

== See also ==
- List of World Heritage Sites in Arab States
