= Scope TV =

Kuwaiti television channel

- Type: Satellite television
- Country: Kuwait
- Headquarters: Kuwait City, Kuwait
- Launch date: 2007

Scope TV is a Kuwaiti satellite television channel founded in 2007 by Fajr Al-Saeed. The executive director is Al-Saeed's brother, Mohammed Talal Al-Saeed. The channel has had a controversial history since it began.

== 2009 issue with the Ministry of Information ==
In August 2009, Scope TV produced a political satire, called Sotik Wisal (Your Voice Has Been Heard), to air during the Ramadan holiday. The show aired 30 minute segments and featured characters that mimicked members of the Kuwaiti Parliament and Government ministers. After three episodes, the Ministry of Information ordered Scope TV to take the show off the air because the show violated Audio-Visual Media Law number 61/2007. The Ministry said:

"the programme violated a media law...[and the show] was suspended until a general prosecution completes an investigation and a ruling is made in court."

Due to the vaguely written media law, Fajr Al-Saeed only had to change the name of the show in order to put it back on the air. She changed the name to Amak Asmakh (They Don't Listen to Anything) and displayed the letter from the Ministry for the entire show time slot.

== Office break-in ==
In October 2010, approximately 150 people broke into the headquarters of Scope TV in Kuwait City in response to a programme they considered critical of the Kuwaiti ruling family. In the week before the attack, Fajr Al-Saeed was questioned by prosecutors in response to a complaint by the Information Ministry that Sawtak Wasal (Your Voice has been Heard) implied attempts to overthrow the Kuwaiti government. On the following Saturday, talk show Zayn wa Shayn (Good and Bad) seemed to accuse an al-Sabah family member, who is also a senior Information Ministry official, of being behind the complaint. The offices were stormed the next day. According to Mohammed Talal Al-Saeed, the assailants had pistols and knives and injured ten people. The ransacking and destruction caused $1 million in damages.

In September 2011, the Kuwaiti lower courts ordered three members of the ruling family to three months in jail each as punishment for breaking into Scope TV's office, firing shots, and attacking people and equipment. However, the men had the option of paying a KD 1,000 (US$3,636) fine to avoid the jail sentence.
