= Funoon TV =

Arabic-language comedy television channel based in Kuwait

- Country: Kuwait
- Broadcast area: Currently broadcast by Nilesat and Arabsat
- Headquarters: Kuwait

Programming
- Language(s): Arabic
- Picture format: 4:3 (576i, SDTV)

Ownership
- Owner: Abdulhussain Abdulredha

History
- Launched: 25 February 2005

Links
- Website: http://watan.tv/eng/Channels/Funoon-TV

Funoon TV (Arabic: قناة الفنون Qanāt al-Funūn) is an Arabic-language comedy television channel based in Kuwait. It was founded by the late Kuwaiti actor Abdulhussain Abdulredha, who is its owner and director. It is the first Arabic-language television channel to specialise in the broadcast of comedy material.

== Achievements channel ==
Since their launch they are achieving success continuum, and thus added more fame and luster and brilliance are distinct yet another offer the artist Abdul Hussain Abdul Rida, as it has done a great productive pumping big money in its sessions for the month of Ramadan and the production of a series and the work exclusive of the channel itself, such as:

- Fadfada 2006
- Tricks, including 2007
- Not a word 2007
- Tricks, including 2 in 2008
- Taxi-hop 2008
- Eyes eye 2008
- My family 2008
- Eyal Bo Salem 2008
- University of nothing 2008
- Not a word 2, 2008
- Tricks, including violin and violin 2009
- Not a word 3, 2009
- Not a word children 2009
- Eye 2 eye 2009
- Osnasid 2009
- Colonel Shamma 2009
- Moza and Weza 2009
- Not a word challenge 2010

== Politics Channel ==
The channel is set up comedy special programs, both programs were particularly original channel and another purchased. And map programs include movies, comedy, ancient and modern, as it also includes the preparation of original software to group presentations comedy touch all aspects of our lives. Combine the original films, serials, comedies, current and classic Kuwait and the Persian Gulf and around the Arab world, as they show films with an unusual model of an unattended, thus ensuring a major attraction for lovers of the new comedy. Is the only channel devoted to make the viewer Arab and foreign expatriate laughs throughout the twenty-four hours seven days a week. The comedy channel and our house is the class of employers, families and youth, adolescents and children and all family
