= List of mammals of Kuwait =

This is a list of the mammal species recorded in Kuwait. There are twenty-five mammal species in Kuwait, of which one is endangered, four are vulnerable, and one is near threatened. One of the species listed for Kuwait can no longer be found in the wild.

The following tags are used to highlight each species' conservation status as assessed by the International Union for Conservation of Nature:

EX	Extinct	No reasonable doubt that the last individual has died.
EW	Extinct in the wild	Known only to survive in captivity or as a naturalized populations well outside its previous range.
CR	Critically endangered	The species is in imminent risk of extinction in the wild.
EN	Endangered	The species is facing an extremely high risk of extinction in the wild.
VU	Vulnerable	The species is facing a high risk of extinction in the wild.
NT	Near threatened	The species does not meet any of the criteria that would categorise it as risking extinction but it is likely to do so in the future.
LC	Least concern	There are no current identifiable risks to the species.
DD	Data deficient	There is inadequate information to make an assessment of the risks to this species.

== Order: Sirenia (manatees and dugongs) ==
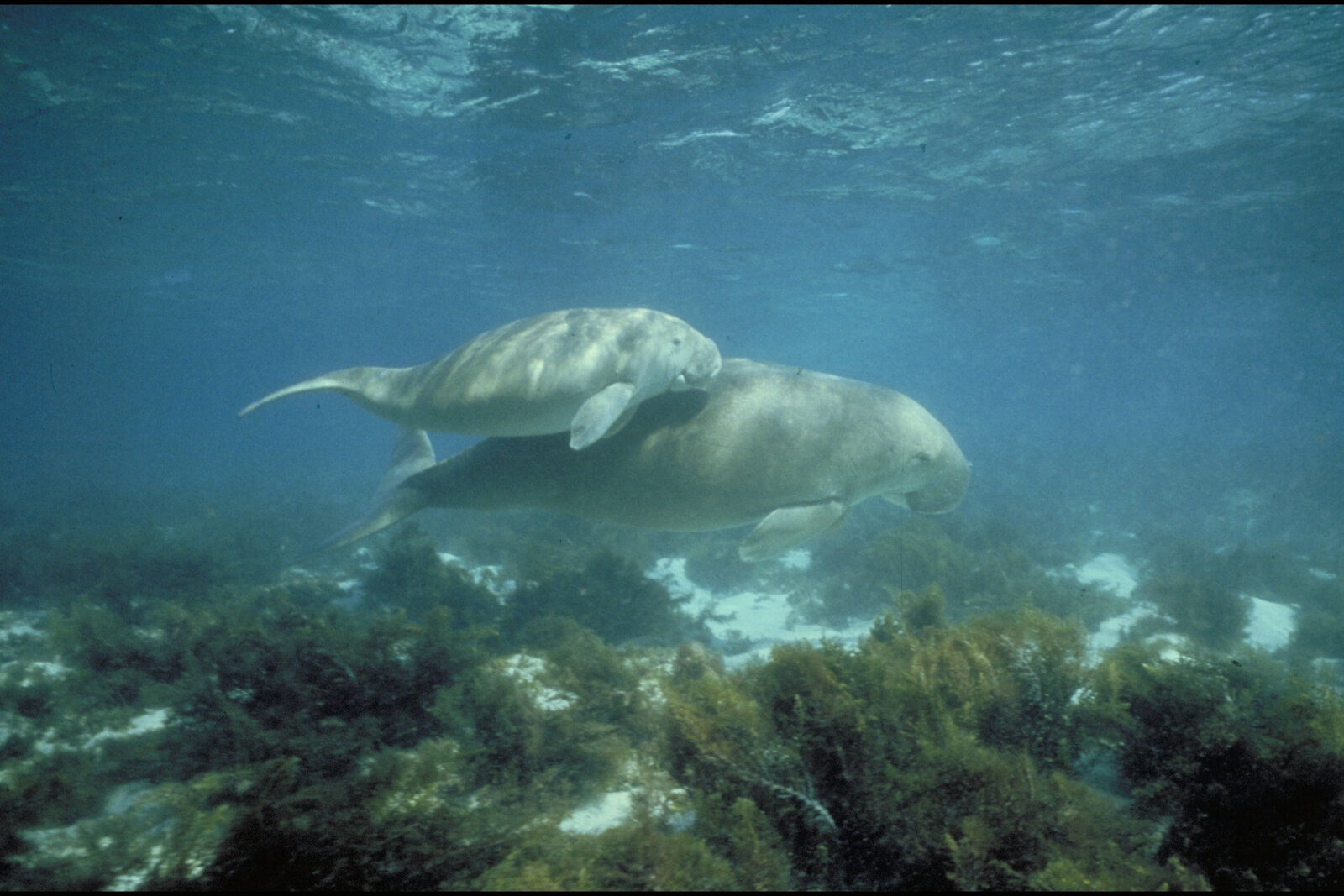
Dugongs

Sirenia is an order of fully aquatic, herbivorous mammals that inhabit rivers, estuaries, coastal marine waters, swamps, and marine wetlands. All four species are endangered.

- Family: Dugongidae
  - Genus: Dugong
    - Dugong, D. dugon VU

== Order: Rodentia (rodents) ==
Rodents make up the largest order of mammals, with over 40% of mammalian species. They have two incisors in the upper and lower jaw which grow continually and must be kept short by gnawing.

- Suborder: Hystricomorpha
  - Family: Hystricidae (Old World porcupines)
    - Genus: Hystrix
      - Indian crested porcupine, H. indica LC
- Suborder: Myomorpha
  - Family: Dipodidae (jerboas)
    - Subfamily: Allactaginae
      - Genus: Allactaga
        - Euphrates jerboa, A. euphratica LC
  - Family: Muridae (mice, rats, gerbils, etc.)
    - Subfamily: Gerbillinae
      - Genus: Gerbillus
        - Cheesman's gerbil, Gerbillus cheesmani
        - Wagner's gerbil, Gerbillus dasyurus LC
      - Genus: Meriones
        - Sundevall's jird, Meriones crassus LC
      - Genus: Tatera
        - Indian gerbil, Tatera indica LC

== Order: Erinaceomorpha (hedgehogs and gymnures) ==
The order Erinaceomorpha contains a single family, Erinaceidae, which comprise the hedgehogs and gymnures. The hedgehogs are easily recognised by their spines while gymnures look more like large rats.

- Family: Erinaceidae (hedgehogs)
  - Subfamily: Erinaceinae
    - Genus: Paraechinus
      - Desert hedgehog, P. aethiopicus LC

== Order: Chiroptera (bats) ==
The bats' most distinguishing feature is that their forelimbs are developed as wings, making them the only mammals capable of flight. Bat species account for about 20% of all mammals.

- Family: Vespertilionidae
  - Subfamily: Vespertilioninae
    - Genus: Pipistrellus
      - Kuhl's pipistrelle, Pipistrellus kuhlii LC
- Family: Rhinopomatidae
  - Genus: Rhinopoma
    - Lesser mouse-tailed bat, Rhinopoma hardwickei LC

== Order: Cetacea (whales) ==
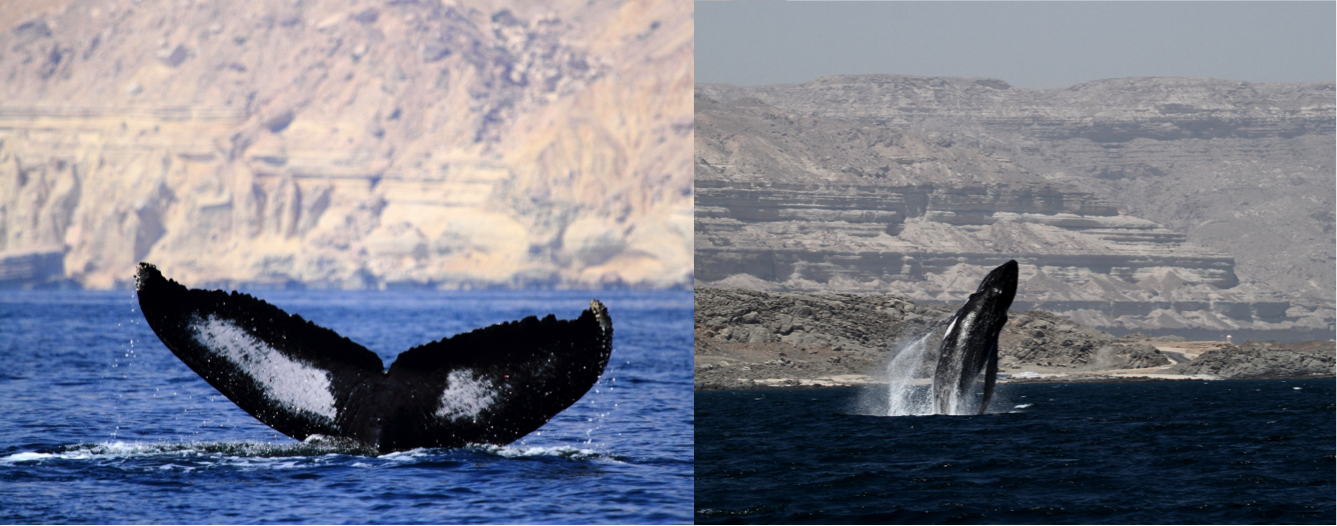
Arabian humpback whales off Dhofar, Oman

The order Cetacea includes whales, dolphins and porpoises. They are the mammals most fully adapted to aquatic life with a spindle-shaped nearly hairless body, protected by a thick layer of blubber, and forelimbs and tail modified to provide propulsion underwater.

- Suborder: Mysticeti
  - Family: Balaenopteridae
    - Subfamily: Balaenopterinae
      - Genus: Balaenoptera
        - Pygmy blue whale, Balaenoptera musculus brevicauda EN
    - Subfamily: Megapterinae
      - Genus: Megaptera
        - Humpback whale, M. novaeangliae LC
- Suborder: Odontoceti
  - Superfamily: Platanistoidea
    - Family: Phocoenidae
      - Genus: Neophocaena
        - Finless porpoise, Neophocaena phocaenoides DD
    - Family: Delphinidae (marine dolphins)
      - Genus: Sousa
        - Indo-Pacific humpbacked dolphin, Sousa chinensis DD
      - Genus: Grampus
        - Risso's dolphin, Grampus griseus DD

== Order: Carnivora (carnivorans) ==
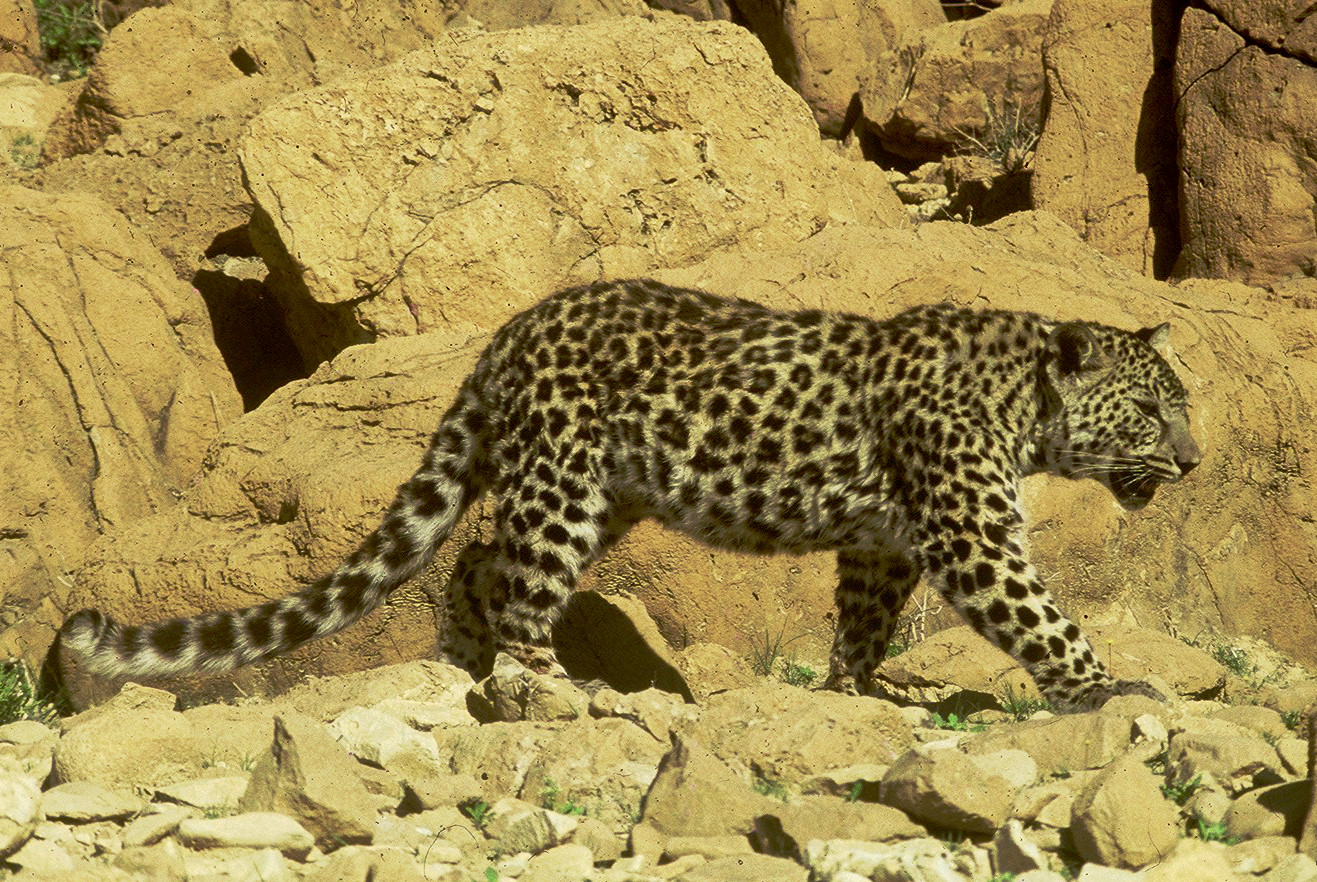
Arabian leopard

There are over 260 species of carnivorans, the majority of which feed primarily on meat. They have a characteristic skull shape and dentition.

- Suborder: Feliformia
  - Family: Felidae (cats)
    - Subfamily: Felinae
      - Genus: Caracal
        - Caracal, C. caracal LC
      - Genus: Felis
        - African wildcat, F. lybica LC
        - Sand cat, F. margarita LC
  - Family: Herpestidae (mongooses)
    - Genus: Urva
      - Indian grey mongoose, U. edwardsii LC
  - Family: Hyaenidae (hyaenas)
    - Genus: Hyaena
      - Striped hyena, H. hyaena NT, presence uncertain
- Suborder: Caniformia
  - Family: Canidae (dogs, foxes)
    - Genus: Vulpes
      - Rüppell's fox, V. rueppellii LC
      - Red fox, V. vulpes LC
  - Family: Mustelidae (mustelids)
    - Genus: Mellivora
      - Honey badger, M. capensis LC

== Locally extinct ==
The following species are locally extinct in the country:

- Cheetah, Acinonyx jubatus
- Saudi gazelle, Gazella saudiya
- Arabian oryx, Oryx leucoryx
- Leopard, Panthera pardus

== See also ==
- List of chordate orders
- Lists of mammals by region
- List of prehistoric mammals
- Mammal classification
- List of mammals described in the 2000s
