= Human trafficking in Kuwait =

Kuwait ratified the 2000 UN TIP Protocol in May 2006.

In 2008 Kuwait was a destination and transit country for men and women for forced labor and commercial sexual exploitation. Men and women migrated willingly from Bangladesh, India, Pakistan, Sri Lanka, Nepal, Indonesia, and the Philippines to work as domestic servants or low-skilled laborers. Upon arrival, however, some were subjected to conditions of forced labor, such as restrictions on movement, unlawful withholding of passports, non-payment of wages, threats, and physical or sexual abuse. In addition, some women were forced into commercial sexual exploitation; for example, some female domestic workers were forced into prostitution after running away from abusive employers or after being deceived with promises of jobs in different sectors. Kuwait was also a transit country for South and East Asian workers recruited by Kuwaiti labor recruitment agencies for low-skilled work in Iraq; some of these workers were deceived as to the true location and nature of this work, while others willingly transit to Iraq through Kuwait, but subsequently endure conditions of involuntary servitude in Iraq. Some Kuwaiti nationals reportedly traveled to destinations including Morocco, Egypt, Afghanistan, Pakistan, India, and Bangladesh to engage in commercial sex acts.

The Government of Kuwait does not fully comply with the minimum standards for the elimination of trafficking, and is not making significant efforts to do so.

The U.S. State Department's Office to Monitor and Combat Trafficking in Persons placed the country in "Tier 2 Watchlist" in 2017. In 2019 Kuwait was placed in Tier 2. In 2023, the country was back on the Tier 2 Watch List.

In 2023, the Organised Crime Index noted the significant role of recruitment agencies in human smuggling.

== Prosecution (2008) ==
Kuwait does prohibit human trafficking in persons (Law No.91 of 2013), and it also prohibits transnational slavery through Article 185 of its criminal code, with a prescribed penalty of five years’ imprisonment and a fine. Article 201 of Kuwait's criminal code prohibits forced prostitution; prescribed penalties include imprisonment of up to five years or a fine for the forced prostitution of adults, and seven years’ imprisonment and a fine prescribed for the forced prostitution of minors under 18 years of age. This year, Kuwait passed an administrative ban on withholding passports, but did not report any efforts to enforce it. Despite the availability of these statutes, the government did not report any prosecutions, convictions, or punishments of traffickers for forced labor, including fraudulent recruiters and abusive employers.

Rather than assign stringent prison penalties for trafficking, Kuwaiti law enforcement efforts generally focus on administrative measures such as shutting down recruitment firms, issuing orders for employers to return withheld passports, or requiring employers pay back-wages. The government also did not provide evidence of prosecuting, convicting, or punishing traffickers for commercial sexual exploitation. In addition, credible reports indicate that government officials are complicit in unlawfully selling worker visas to labor recruiters, thereby facilitating trafficking. The government reported no prosecutions, convictions, or punishments for complicity in trafficking. The government did not provide specialized training to law enforcement officers, lawyers, or judges on investigating or prosecuting trafficking.

== Protection (2008) ==
During the year, Kuwait made uneven efforts to improve protection for victims of trafficking. In September, the government opened a temporary shelter for victims of forced labor. The shelter has a maximum capacity of 40 women and provides medical, psychological, and legal services. It is unknown how many victims this shelter has accommodated to date. Credible sources report, however, that the shelter turns away victims who want to file complaints of trafficking or other abuses against their employers. The government continues to lack formal procedures for the systematic identification and protection of trafficking victims among vulnerable populations, such as foreign workers arrested without proper identity documents and women arrested for prostitution. As such, victims of trafficking are sometimes detained or deported for acts committed as a result of being trafficked, such as running away from their sponsors in violation of immigration laws and prostitution. Victims who are deported are not offered legal alternatives to their removal to countries in which they may face retribution. The police do not encourage victims to assist in criminal investigations of their traffickers. Government authorities often encourage victims to settle complaints against their employers out of court. In many cases, police do not take the complaints of trafficking victims seriously, and may also treat them as criminals for leaving their sponsors.

== Prevention (2008) ==
Kuwait made no reported efforts to prevent trafficking in persons this year. The government did not produce any public awareness campaigns during the reporting period to warn employers and workers about the risks of trafficking. Kuwait also did not launch a public awareness campaign targeting citizens traveling to known child sex tourism destinations abroad. The government did not make any discernible efforts to reduce the demand for commercial sex acts.

== See also ==
- Slavery in Kuwait
- Migrant workers in Kuwait
