= .kw =

Internet country-code for Kuwait

- Introduced: 26 October 1992
- TLD type: Country code top-level domain
- Status: Active
- Registry: Communication and Information Technology Regulatory Authority (CITRA)
- Sponsor: Communications and Information Technology Regulatory Authority (CITRA) (Kuwait)
- Intended use: Entities connected with Kuwait
- Actual use: Popular in Kuwait
- Registration restrictions: Limited to Kuwaiti citizens and residents, companies, and organizations; must show appropriate documents to prove status; some third-level names have additional restrictions
- Structure: Registrations are made at second or third level
- Documents: Policies
- Dispute policies: Complaints Policy
- Registry website: www.kw

.kw is the Internet country code top-level domain (ccTLD) for Kuwait. Domain registrations are at the second and third level beneath these names:

Registration is done through accredited registrars by providing the right documents and a fee of 15 KD per year, with the license period running either one or two years (currently there is an intention to allow any period between 1 and 10 years in near future).

== Domain types ==
- com.kw: Commercial entities with a valid commercial license from the Ministry of Commerce and Industry.
- ind.kw: An individual who is not a minor and holds Kuwaiti nationality or a resident who holds a valid residence in the State of Kuwait.
- net.kw: ICT licensed company from the respective authorities in the State of Kuwait.
- org.kw: A non-profit entity licensed by the concerned authorities in the State of Kuwait to operate.
- gov.kw: Ministries & Government entities.
- emb.kw: Embassies of other countries in Kuwait.
- edu.kw: An educational entity licensed by the concerned authorities in the State of Kuwait to operate.
- .kw: currently in a 6-month Sunrise phase
