= Mahdi (disambiguation) =

The Mahdi is the prophesied redeemer of Islam. Mehdi is a variant alternative transliteration.

Mahdi may also refer to:

== Islam ==
- Al-Mahdi (744–785), third Abbasid Caliph, who ruled 775–785
- Muhammad al-Mahdi (869–?), twelfth and final Imam of Twelver Shi`a Islam
- Muhammad II al-Mahdi (976–1010), fourth Caliph of Córdoba in Al-Andalus (11th-century Moorish Iberia)
- Abdallah al-Mahdi Billah (873–934), Isma'ili imam and founder of the Fatimid dynasty, who ruled 909–934
- Mohammed Ahmed Mahdi or Muhammad Ahmad bin Abd Allah (1844–1885), Nubian religious leader of the Samaniyya order in Sudan
- Al-Mahdi al-Husayn (987–1013), imam of the Zaidi state in Yemen who ruled in the years 1003–1013

ibn al Mahdi

- Ubaydallah ibn al-Mahdi (771–810/11), Abbasid prince
- Ibrahim ibn al-Mahdi (779–839), Abbasid prince, singer, composer and poet
- Lubana bint Ali ibn al-Mahdi (c. 787/789 – after 820), Arab princess and poet

bint al Mahdi

- Abbasa bint al-Mahdi ibn al-Mansur ibn Muhammad (c. 765 – after 803), Abbasid princess
- Ulayya bint al-Mahdi (777–825), Abbasid princess

== People with the given name ==
=== Arts and entertainment ===
- Mahdi Falahati (born 1958), Iranian writer, political expert, television presenter and poet
- Mahdi Fleifel (born 1979), Danish-Palestinian film director
- Mahdi McCrae (1907–1990), artist and cartoonist
- Mahdi Pakdel (born 1980), Iranian actor

=== Politics ===
- Mahdi Mirbaqiri, Iranian politician and cleric (born 1961)
- Abu Mahdi al-Muhandis (1954–2020), Iraqi leader, and commander of the Popular Mobilisation Committee
- Mahdi al-Arabi, Libyan brigadier-general who served in the Libyan Armed Forces
- Mahdi Amel, pen name and pseudonym of Hassan Abdullah Hamdan (1936–1987), Lebanese Marxist intellectual and militant
- Mehdi Bazargan (1907–1995), Iranian scholar, academic, activist and head of Iran's interim government
- Mahdi Dakhlallah (born 1947), Syrian politician and diplomat
- Mahdi Eraqi, or Mehdi Araghi (1930–1979), a founder of Fadayan-e Islam
- Mahdi Al-Gharrawi, Iraqi police officer, the former Commander of the Iraqi Federal Police in Nineveh Province, and Lieutenant General
- Mahdi Mohammed Gulaid, Somali politician, Vice President and then Acting Prime Minister of the Federal Republic of Somalia
- Mahdi Aliyu Gusau (born 1981), Nigerian politician, deputy governor of Zamfara State
- Mahdi al-Hafez (born 1943), Minister of Planning in the Interim Iraq Governing Council cabinet
- Mahdi al-Harati (born c. 1973), Irish-Libyan politician and former co-commander of the Tripoli Brigade during the Libyan Civil War
- Mahdi Quli Khan Hidayat (1863–1955), Iranian politician, Prime Minister of Iran
- Abdul Mahdi al-Karbalai (born 1955), Iraqi Shia Muslim scholar
- Mahdi al-Mashat (born 1986), Yemeni political figure from the Houthi movement
- Mahdi Al Tajir (born 1931), Ambassador of the United Arab Emirates to the United Kingdom
- Mahdi Tajik (born 1981), Iranian student activist, journalist and political prisoner

=== Religion ===
- Al-Mahdi Ahmad (1633–1681), Imam of Yemen who ruled 1676–1681
- Al-Mahdi Muhammad bin Ahmed (1637–1718), also known as Ṣāḥib al-Mawāhib, Imam of Yemen who ruled 1689–1718
- Al-Mahdi Abbas (1719–1775), Imam of Yemen who ruled 1748–1775
- Mahdi Puya or Ayatullah Agha Hajji Mirza Mahdi Puya Yazdi (1899–1973), Twelver Shi`a Muslim and Islamic scholar
- Mahdi al-Modarresi (born 1977), Muslim scholar and lecturer

=== Sports ===
- Al-Mahdi Ali Mukhtar (born 1992), Qatari footballer
- Mahdi Abdul-Sahib (born 1956), Iraqi footballer
- Mahdi Abduljabbar (born 1991), Bahraini footballer
- Mahdi Abu-Omar (born 1970), Palestinian American chemist
- Mahdi Afri (born 1996), Moroccan visually impaired Paralympic athlete
- Mahdi Fahri Albaar (born 1995), Indonesian footballer
- Mahdi Ali or Mahdi Ali Hassan Redha (born 1965), Emirati footballer and sports manager
- Mahdi Camara (born 1998), French footballer
- Mahdi Ben Cheikh (born 1979), Tunisian volleyball player
- Mahdi Fahes (born 1994), Lebanese footballer
- Mahdi Houryar (born 1945), Iranian wrestler
- Mahdi Jassim (born 1956), Iraqi footballer
- Mahdi Javid (born 1987), Iranian futsal player
- Mahdi Kadhim (born 1967), Iraqi footballer
- Mahdi Kamil Shiltagh (born 1995), Iraqi footballer
- Mahdi Karim Ajeel (born 1983), Iraqi footballer
- Mahdi El Khammasi (born 1987), Tunisian born-Qatari footballer
- Mahdi Houssein Mahabeh (born 1995), Djibouti footballer
- Mahdi Marandi (born 1986), Iranian volleyball player
- Mahdi Ouatine (born 1987), Moroccan amateur boxer
- Mahdi Salman, Iraqi basketball player

=== Others ===
- Mahdi Abbaszadeh, Iranian philosopher and associate professor of epistemology
- Mahdi Abdul Hadi (born 1944), a political scientist, historian, columnist, author, founder and member of various Palestinian, Arab and international institutions
- Mahdi Agnelli born Edoardo Agnelli (1954–2000), eldest child and only son of Gianni Agnelli, the industrialist patriarch of Fiat
- Mahdi Ahouie (born 1977), Iranian political scientist
- Mahdi Bray, born Wright Bray (born 1950), Muslim American civil and human rights activist
- Mahdi Elmandjra (1933–2014), Moroccan futurist, economist and sociologist
- Mahdi Ghalibafian (1935-2007), Iranian civil engineer and university professor
- Mahdi Gilbert (born 1989), Canadian professional sleight of hand card magician
- Mahdi S. Hantush (1921–1984), American hydrologist
- Mahdi Moudini (born Mahdi Moammer; 1979), Iranian illusionist
- Mahdi Khajeh Piri (born 1955), founder of Noor International Microfilm Center

== People with the middle name ==
=== Arts and entertainment ===
- Amir Mahdi Jule (born 1980), Iranian screenwriter and actor

=== Politics ===
- Ali Mahdi Muhammad (born 1939), politician and entrepreneur, president of Somalia in 1991
- Ali Yahya Mahdi Al Raimi, Yemeni who was captured and transferred to the United States Guantanamo Bay Naval Base
- Muhammad Mahdi Kubba (1900–1984), Iraqi politician
- Muhammad al-Mahdi as-Senussi (1844–1902), the supreme leader of the Sufi Senussi Order
- Salih Mahdi Ammash (1924–1985), Iraqi historian, writer, author, poet, politician and Iraqi army officer
- Sayyid Hasan ar-Rida al-Mahdi as-Sanussi (1928–1992), King of Libya
- Sayyid Muhammad bin Sayyid Hasan ar-Rida al-Mahdi as-Sanussi (born 1962), Crown Prince of Libya

=== Religion ===
- Mohammed Mahdi Akef (1928–2017), head of the Muslim Brotherhood
- Mirza Mahdi Elahi Qomshehei (1901–1973), Iranian mystic, poet, translator of the Quran, and one of the grand Masters of the philosophical school of Tehran
- Mirza Mahdi al-Shirazi (1887–1961), also known as Grand Ayatollah Mirza Mahdi al-Husayni al-Shirazi, Iraqi-Iranian Shia marja
- Mulla Muhammad Mahdi Naraqi (1715–1795), Shia philosopher and theologian

=== Sports ===
- Mohammad Mahdi Jafari (born 1964), Iranian karateka
- Mohannad Mahdi Al-Nadawi (born 1975), Iraqi footballer

=== Others ===
- Amèle El Mahdi (born 1956), Algerian professor of mathematics and writer
- Huda Salih Mahdi Ammash (1953–2016), American-educated Iraqi scientist
- Mirza Mahdi Ashtiani (1888–1952), Iranian philosopher
- Mohammad Mahdi Nayebi (born 1967), Iranian electrical engineer
- Syed Mahdi Hasnain, Indian commanding officer

== People with the surname ==
=== Arts and entertainment ===
- Alexander Siddig or Siddig El Tahir El Fadil El Siddig Abderahman Mohammed Ahmed Abdel Karim El Mahdi (born 1965), a Sudanese-born British actor

=== Politics ===
- Abbas Mahdi (born 1898), Iraqi politician and public servant
- Abd al-Rahman al-Mahdi (1885–1959), religious and political figures in Anglo-Egyptian Sudan
- Abdirahman Mahdi, founder of the Ogaden National Liberation Front
- Abubakar Mahdi, Nigerian politician and Senator for the Borno South constituency of Borno State, Nigeria
- Adil Abdul-Mahdi (born 1942), Prime Minister of Iraq
- Ahmad al-Faqi al-Mahdi (born 1975), also known as Abu Tourab, member of Ansar Dine, a Tuareg Islamist militia in North Africa
- Ahmad Hamza Al-Mahdi, Libyan politician
- Fawaz Naman Hamoud Abdallah Mahdi, extrajudicial prisoner of the United States
- Imam al-Hadi al-Mahdi or Sayyid Hadi Abdulrahman al-Mahdi (1918–1971), Sudanese political and religious figure and leader of the Sudanese Ansar religious order
- Khaled A. Mahdi (born 1970), Kuwaiti government official
- Mariam al-Mahdi (born 1965), Sudanese politician
- Mubarak al Fadil al Mahdi (born 1950), Sudanese economist and politician
- Muhammad Mahdi Salih Al-Rawi (born 1947 or 1949), Iraqi politician and government minister
- Sadiq al-Mahdi (born 1935), Sudanese political and religious figure
- Siddick Sayed el-Mahdi (1911–1961), Sudanese religious and political leader
- Sammy Mahdi (born 1988), Belgian politician

=== Religion ===
- Abdul Razzaq al-Mahdi (born 1961), Syrian Islamist cleric

=== Sports ===
- Ala Addin Mahdi (born 1996), Yemeni footballer
- Dhurgham Mahdi (born 1951), Iraqi footballer
- Khaled Mahdi (footballer) (born 1987), Palestinian footballer
- Saleh Mehdi (born 1981), Kuwaiti footballer

=== Others ===
- As Sayyid Al Imaam Issa Al Haadi Al Mahdi also known as Malachi Z. York, Issa Al Haadi Al Mahdi, better known as Dwight York (born 1945), American musician and writer
- Mikal Mahdi (1983–2025), American executed spree killer
- Muhsin Mahdi (1926–2007), Iraqi-American Islamologist and Arabist
- Saudatu Mahdi (born 1957), Nigerian women's rights advocate

== Places ==
Mosques

- Al-Mahdi Mosque, the Mosque of the Dome of the Mahdi or Al-Mahdi Mosque, one of the historical mosques in the historic old city of Sana'a, Yemen
- Al Mahdi Mosque, Bradford in Bradford, United Kingdom
- Imam Mahdi Mosque, a mosque located in Kuwait City

Others

- Aba Saleh al-Mahdi tunnel, a highway tunnel in Asia running under the Zagros Mountains in the Eqlid, Fars Province of Iran
- El Imam El Mahdi University, Sudanese university
- Sidi Mahdi Airport, Algeria
- Tizi Mahdi, town and commune in Médéa Province, Algeria

== Others ==
- 33rd Al-Mahdi Division, brigade of the Islamic Revolutionary Guard Corps named after the twelfth Shia Imam, Al-Mahdi
- Abu Mahdi (missile), an Iranian naval cruise missile
- The Mahdi (novel), a 1981 political fiction novel
- Mahdi Army, now known as the Peace Companies, militia controlled by Muqtada al-Sadr in Iraq
- Mahdi (Dune), a fictional prophet in Frank Herbert's Dune universe
- Mahdi (malware), malware discovered in February 2012

== See also ==
- List of Mahdi claimants, religious leaders claiming the position
- Mahdavi (disambiguation)
- Mahdaviat (disambiguation)
- Mahdist (disambiguation)
- Mahdia (disambiguation)
- Mahdist War, a colonial war of the late 19th century
- Mardi (disambiguation)
- Muhammad Ahmad (1844–1885), leader of Sudan's mahdiyya regime in the 19th century
