= Mahdiyeh =

Mahdiyeh, or Mehdiyeh (Persian: مهديه) may refer to these places in Iran:

- Mehdiyeh, Chaharmahal and Bakhtiari
- Mahdiyeh, Fars
- Mahdiyeh, Ilam
- Mahdiyeh, Chadegan, Isfahan Province
- Mehdiyeh, Kerman
- Mahdiyeh, Khuzestan
- Mehdiyeh, South Khorasan

== See also ==
- Mahdia (disambiguation)
- Mehdiyan, a cemetery in Delhi, India
