= Mardi (disambiguation) =

Mardi or Mardi and a Voyage Thither is an 1849 novel by American author Herman Melville.

Mardi, the French word for Tuesday, may also refer to:

- Mardi (people), an Iranian tribe
- Mardi, Medak district, Andhra Pradesh, India
- Mardi, New South Wales, a suburb in Australia
- Märdi, Valga County, an Estonian village
- Märdi, Võru County, an Estonian village
- Malaysian Agricultural Research and Development Institute
- Mars Descent Imager, an instrument aboard the Curiosity Mars Rover
- Mardi (given name)

== See also ==
- Mardi Gras (disambiguation)
- Mahdi (disambiguation)
- Mardis, a surname
