= Mardi (given name) =

Mardi is a given name. Notable people named Mardi include:

- Mardi Barrie (1930–2004) Scottish artist and teacher
- Mardi Dungey (1966–2019), Australian macroeconomist
- Mardi Hastings, American mechanical and acoustical engineer
- Mardi Oakley Medawar, American novelist of Cherokee descent
- Mardi Pieronek (born 1962), Canadian TikToker and transgender historian
- Mardi Rustam (born ca. 1931), American film producer and director
- Mardi Wormhoudt (1937–2009), American politician and social worker

== See also ==
- Mardi (disambiguation)
