= Medawar =

Medawar may refer to:

- Jean Medawar (1913–2005), British author, chairman of the Family Planning Association
- Joseph Medawar, Lebanese-American film producer and banker
- Mardi Oakley Medawar, American novelist of Cherokee descent
- Peter Medawar (1915–1987), Nobel Prize-winning British biologist
  - Medawar Lecture, a former annual Royal Society lecture
  - Medawar Medal, awarded by the British Transplant Society
  - Medawar zone, the area of problems most likely to produce fruitful results
- Pierre Kamel Medawar (1887–1985), bishop in the Melkite church
- Medawar, a quarter of Beirut, Lebanon
