= Mahdavi =

A Mahdavi (Persian: مهدوی) is an adherent of Mahdavia, a Mahdi'ist Muslim denomination. It may also refer to:

== Places ==
- Shahid Mahdavi Stadium, a stadium in Bushehr, Iran
- Shahrak-e Mahdavi, a village in Fars, Iran

== People ==
An Iranian surname:

- Ahmad Mahdavi Damghani, Iranian scholar
- Ali Mahdavi (born 1974), Iranian-French photographer
- India Mahdavi (born 1962), Iranian-French architect and designer
- Justine Harun-Mahdavi (born 1945), German writer
- Mohammad-Reza Mahdavi Kani (1931–2014), Iranian ayatollah
- Mohammad Reza Mahdavi (born 1972), Iranian footballer
- Mohammad Reza Mahdavi (born 1981), Iranian footballer

== See also ==
- Mahdist (disambiguation)
- Mahdaviat (disambiguation)
- Mahdi (disambiguation)
