= Siddiqa Fatima Zahra Mosque =

Mosque in Kuwait

- مسجد الصداقة فاطمة الزهراء
- The mosque in 2011

- Location of the mosque in Kuwait

Religion
- Affiliation: Islam
- Ecclesiastical or organizational status: Mosque
- Status: Active

Location
- Location: Dahiya Abdullah Mubarak City
- Country: Kuwait
- Interactive map of Siddiqa Fatima Zahra Mosque
- Coordinates: 29°13′54″N 47°53′47″E

Architecture
- Architect: Dar Tahir Consultants
- Style: Contemporary Mughal
- Founder: MP Hassan Jowhar
- Groundbreaking: February 2008
- Completed: 2011

Specifications
- Capacity: 4,000 worshipers
- Domes: 9: 1 main dome; 4 chhattris; 4 on the minarets
- Dome height (outer): 22 m (72 ft)
- Minaret: 4
- Minaret height: 42 m (138 ft)
- Site area: 3,200 m^{2} (34,000 sq ft)
- Materials: Marble

Thr Siddiqua Fatima Zahra Mosque (Arabic: مسجد فاطمة الزهراء) is a mosque located in the Dahiya Abdullah Mubarak community, near the Kuwait International Airport, in Kuwait.

== Overview ==
Work commenced in February 2008 and was completed in June 2011. The total area is 3,200 square metres (34,000 sq ft), that can hold approximately 3,500 men with a separate area for 500 women. The structure includes four minarets that stand 33 metres (108 ft) tall and 42 metres (138 ft) from the ground, and a main dome that is 16 metres (52 ft) wide and 22 metres (72 ft) high, with eight smaller domes. The marble, imported from Iran, was worked on by Iranian and Indian artisans working 24 hours each day for eight months. Designed by Dar Tahir Consultants in a joint project of Eng. Hani from Egypt and Mr. Anwar, a design developer from Pakistan, the mosque was completed in contemporary style similar the Taj Mahal, a landmark of Mughal architecture in India.

== See also ==
- List of mosques in Kuwait
- Islam in Kuwait
- habeeb al kazemi
