= Shia Islam in Kuwait =

Shia Islam constitutes a significant minority in Kuwait. In 2001, the US Department of State reported that there were 300,000 Shia Kuwaiti citizens and 820,000 Kuwaiti citizens in total thus Shias formed 36.5% of the Kuwaiti citizen population. In 2002, the US Department of State reported that Shia Kuwaitis formed 30-40% of Kuwait's citizen population, noting there were 525,000 Sunni citizens and 855,000 Kuwaiti citizens in total (61% Sunnis, 39% Shias). In 2004, there were 300,000-350,000 Shia Kuwaiti citizens and 913,000 Kuwaiti citizens in total. The Strategic Studies Institute reported that they constitute 40% of the population in 2008.

Most Shia Kuwaitis are of indigenous Arab descent. Contrary to the expectations of the Iraqi government, Shia Kuwaitis founded an armed resistance movement during Saddam Hussein's occupation of Kuwait (1990–91). Many Kuwaitis arrested, tortured and executed during the occupation bore Shia names. The Kuwaiti resistance's casualty rate exceeded that of the coalition military forces and hostages.

According to NGOs and human rights organisations, the Shia community face marginalisation in social, economic, and political fields, including "glass ceiling" discrimination in employment. Shia are under-represented in all levels of government and parliament. Kuwaiti government policy, on paper, allegedly does not discriminate citizens on a sectarian basis. Several female MPs, including Rola Dashti, have been Shia.

The International Rehabilitation Council for Torture Victims and United Nations criticized the Kuwaiti authorities' treatment of the so-called "Abdali Cell". In November 2021, Kuwait arbitrarily detained eight elderly Shia Kuwaiti men without any charges.

Mohamad Al-Mail, a scholar and political activist who was granted refugee status in the United Kingdom in 2017, was sentenced in absentia to 10 years' imprisonment at the age of 19 after criticising Sunni sectarian attitudes. In June 2022, his case was the subject of a written question in the UK Parliament concerning the imprisonment of Shia dissidents. In October 2025, Al-Mail was stripped of his Kuwaiti citizenship as part of a broader crackdown on dissent.

== See also ==
- 'Ajam of Kuwait
- Imam Baqir Mosque
- Imam Hussein Mosque (Kuwait)
- Baharna in Kuwait
