= List of killings by law enforcement officers in the United States, November 2015 =

This is a list of people reported killed by non-military law enforcement officers in the United States in November 2015, whether in the line of duty or not, and regardless of reason or method. The listing documents the occurrence of a death, making no implications regarding wrongdoing or justification on the part of the person killed or officer involved. Killings are arranged by date of the incident that caused death. Different death dates, if known, are noted in the description. The table below lists 85 people.

== November 2015 ==
Date	Name (Age) of Deceased	Race	State (City)	Description
2015-11-30	Darius Smith (18)	Black	Georgia (Atlanta)	
2015-11-30	Fernando Sauceda (31)	Hispanic	Wink, TX	
2015-11-30	Tuan Hoang (25)	Asian	Aurora, CO	
2015-11-29	Hugo Fernando Celio (23)	Hispanic	California (Bakersfield)	About 2 AM Bakersfield Police officers were dispatched to bar where a fight had broken out. One of the suspects ran and was chased by police. The suspect, Celio, pulled a gun and fired at the officers. Police returned fire and hit Celio. He died later at a local hospital.
2015-11-29	Ralph Aguilar (69)	Hispanic	Sun City, AZ	
2015-11-29	Zachary Grigsby (29)	White	Lincoln, NE	
2015-11-29	Lionel Kerns (53)	White	Stewartsville, MO	
2015-11-29	Justin D. McHenry (22)	White	Celina, OH	
2015-11-28	Kevin Close (50)	White	Seagoville, TX	
2015-11-27	Rick Gullickson (58)	White	Lampe, MO	
2015-11-26	Andrew Thomas (26)	White	California (Paradise)	Thomas, a suspect in a drunken driving crash that killed his wife, was shot by Paradise Police Officer Patrick Feaster after standing up while inside the overturned vehicle. Feaster claimed the gun accidentally discharged. Thomas was paralyzed from his wounds, and died from his injuries on December 19, 2015. Feaster was found guilty of involuntary manslaughter in Thomas' death in 2016.
2015-11-25	Magnum Edgar Phillips (23)	White	Springfield, MO	
2015-11-25	Somer Brook Speer (37)	White	Ozark, MO	
2015-11-25	Douglas R. Slade (52)	White	Eagar, AZ	
2015-11-24	Freddy Baez (24)	Black	Camden, NJ	
2015-11-24	Michael Gerald Ray Kirvelay (45)	White	Columbia Heights, MN	
2015-11-23	Barry Kirk (50)	White	Ohio (Columbus)	After shooting a family of four living across the street, killing three and wounding the older daughter, Kirk was chased by police and shot multiple times while returning to his home in the Hilltop neighborhood.
2015-11-23	Henry Reyna (49)	Hispanic	Corpus Christi, TX	
2015-11-23	Thomas Joseph McEniry (32)	White	Nevada (Las Vegas)	McEniry refused to show his hands and police said they might have found the weapon.
2015-11-22	Miguel Angel Martinez (28)	Hispanic	Denver, CO	
2015-11-22	Mathew Grows (45)	White	Reno, NV	
2015-11-22	James Daniel Hall (47)	White	California (Fontana)	Fontana Police responded to a 4:15 am 911 call reporting a robbery in progress at a gas station. Officers arrived to find the suspect who went back into the store, armed with a knife and a rock. Police say that he was shot and killed when he advanced toward the officers.
2015-11-21	Marshall, Michael Lee (50)		Colorado (Denver)	Mentally ill and homeless inmate was put on life support after allegedly being restrained by multiple deputies, losing consciousness and going into a vegetative state, eventually taken off life support nine days after the incident.
2015-11-20	Martin Arturo Rivera (56)	Hispanic	California (Fontana)	Fontana Police responded to a 12:30 a.m. call from a resident who complained that a neighbor was banging on his door and he feared the neighbor had a weapon. When officers arrived they contacted the man in the front yard of the residence. When the man did not comply with police orders the officer shot and killed him. A gun was found with the body of Martin Rivera. Rivera was reported to have had mental problems.
2015-11-19	Nathaniel Harris Pickett Jr. (29)	Black	California (Barstow)	A deputy from San Bernardino Sheriffs Department saw Pickett jump a fence into a motel parking lot. The deputy questioned Pickett who gave a false name. When the deputy tried to handcuff Pickett they fought and the deputy shot and killed him.
2015-11-21	Christopher Lynn Nichols (24)	White	Colbert, OK	
2015-11-20	William Tarrant (39)	White	Dallas, GA	
2015-11-20	Chase Alan Sherman (32)	White	Palmetto, GA	
2015-11-19	Randy Allen Smith (34)	Black	Bradenton, FL	
2015-11-19	Steve Dormil (27)	Black	Fort Pierce, FL	
2015-11-19	Darick Napper (34)	Black	Washington, DC	
2015-11-18	Cornelius Brown (25)	Black	Opa-locka, FL	
2015-11-18	Marcus Deon Meridy (44)	Black	Benton Harbor, MI	
2015-11-18	Tiara Thomas (30)	Black	Portage, IN	
2015-11-17	Francis Hartnett (47)	White	Little Egg Harbor Township, NJ	
2015-11-17	Yohans Leon (28)	Black	Florida (Miami)	
2015-11-17	Derry Eugene Touchstone (58)	White	Arlington, GA	
2015-11-17	Demetrius Shelley Bryant (21)	Black	Cayce, SC	
2015-11-17	Michael Tindall (41)	White	Weatherford, TX	
2015-11-17	Jeray Chatham (30)	Black	Texas (Houston)	
2015-11-16	Brett Kelby Noblitt (25)	White	Dalton, GA	
2015-11-16	Cameron Davis Long (28)	White	Centerville, TX	
2015-11-15	John Livingston (32)	White	Spring Lake, NC	
2015-11-15	Shane Tyler Whitehead (16)	Black	Philadelphia, PA	
2015-11-15	Jamar Clark (24)	Black	Minnesota (Minneapolis)	Clark was shot in the head by Minneapolis police and died in hospital one day later. He allegedly interfered with paramedics' efforts to aid a woman with whom he was allegedly in a physical altercation. Police and witness accounts differ on whether Clark was already handcuffed when he was shot.
2015-11-15	Richard Perkins (39)	Black	California (Oakland)	Oakland police officers responding to a sideshow were standing at the site when one of the officers saw Perkins walking toward them pulling a gun from his waistband and shouted a warning to the other officers. The four officers shot Perkins fifteen times, killing him. The gun turned out to be a pellet gun. The family, who has filed a civil rights lawsuit against the city say that a video surveillance camera shows Perkins was dropping the weapon on a sidewalk and not walking toward the officers.
2015-11-14	Ramon Salazar (31)	Hispanic	California (Jurupa Valley)	Riverside County Sheriffs deputies responded to a report of trouble at a Subway store and found a suspect carrying a hammer. When he did not drop the hammer as ordered deputies tased him but that was ineffective. Deputies say the suspect charged toward them so they shot him. Ramon Salazar was taken to a local hospital where he died. Subway employees had called because the man had been using the hammer to break things in front of the store. They had called a second time reporting he was inside the store.
2015-11-14	Rashad Bugg-Bey (25)	Black	Washington, DC	
2015-11-13	Matthew Eric Coleman (25)	White	Eden, GA	
2015-11-13	Michael Joseph Bartkiewicz (52)	White	Trenton, TN	
2015-11-13	Ernesto Gamino (25)	Hispanic	California (Jurupa Valley)	A deputy from Riverside County Sheriffs Department responded to a call about a man drinking in Rancho Mira Loma Park. The deputy got into a fight with Ernesto Gamino and shot and killed him.
2015-11-12	Moises Nerio (42)	Hispanic	California (Sunnyvale)	Nerio was shot and killed by Sunnyvale police officers when he charged at them with a knife. Police were at the apartment complex in response to a woman's call reporting an attack.
2015-11-11	Javier Lopez Garcia (25)	Hispanic	California (San Francisco)	Lopez Garcia robbed a sporting goods store at gunpoint and stole a shotgun, telling the clerk he wanted to die.. He then went to a hospital construction site and climbed to the sixth floor. When police arrived they heard his shots and climbed up near his location. When he pointed the shotgun toward police, they shot and killed him.
2015-11-11	Joseph Jaramillo (31)	Hispanic	Albuquerque, NM	
2015-11-11	Brian H. Gavin Sr. (57)	White	Aiken, SC	
2015-11-11	Ryan Quinn Martin (32)	Black	Maryland (Baltimore)	
2015-11-10	Dana Bruce Ott (63)	White	Colorado Springs, CO	
2015-11-10	Jason Leanard Mesaros (36)	Hispanic	Brighton, CO	
2015-11-10	Andrew Blake (22)	White	Dillon, MT	
2015-11-10	Eddie Gabriel “Gabe” Sanchez Jr. (34)	Hispanic	California (Chico)	Chico Police were watching a residence in preparation for serving a robbery warrant on Sanchez. When Sanchez walked away from the home detectives attempted to detain him. As he ran away he pointed a handgun at the detectives. One of the detectives fired three shots from his pistol, hitting Sanchez twice, killing him.
2015-11-09	Dale Maverick Hudson (26)	White	West Virginia (Lewis County)	According to the U.S. Marshals Service, deputy marshals, along with West Virginia State Police, were attempting to arrest a fugitive in a rural location near the Lewis and Braxton County line when they were fired upon. Officers returned fire, striking both fugitives, killing one and injuring the other.
2015-11-09	Cesar Cuellar Jr. (25)	Hispanic	Laredo, TX	
2015-11-09	Antonio Henry (22)	Black	Oviedo, FL	
2015-11-09	Adarius Brown (22)	Black	Oviedo, FL	
2015-11-09	Delvin Tyrell Simmons (20)	Black	Spartanburg, SC	
2015-11-09	Leonel Acevedo (45)	Hispanic	California (San Jose)	San Jose Police responded when a man with a handgun was seen forcing a woman into a house. Police surrounded the house. Hours later a man with a gun was seen exiting the house. Police say an officer opened fire when Acevedo shot at them. Acevedo was killed at the scene.
2015-11-09	Miguel Cano (34)	Hispanic	California (Los Angeles)	Cano, a drifter who was reported to have problems with alcohol abuse, apparently was injured in an encounter with skaters according to a witness. He walked away from two people who were trying to help him and out into the street. Moments later the friends heard gunfire. They soon learned that he had been shot by police who had been trying to arrest him for acting strangely and standing in traffic. Police say that in their attempt to arrest Cano they used a taser which was ineffective and they tried to use a bean bag shotgun. When Cano took the bean bag weapon and shot at the officers they fired at him, killing him.
2015-11-06	Raymond Davis (68)	White	Deltona, FL	
2015-11-06	Kim Lee Long (48)	White	Wadesboro, NC	
2015-11-06	James Francis Smyth (55)	White	Las Vegas, NV	
2015-11-06	Michael Gregory Johnson (51)	White	Oregon (Portland)	Portland Police officers responded to a call of a man with a gun to his head in parking lot near Good Samaritan Medical Center. After the first two officers arrived police also responded with the Special Emergency Response Team and the Crisis Negotiation Team. During the encounter Johnson twice fired his weapon into the ground. When Johnson fired his weapon a third time, members of the Special Emergency Response Team shot and killed him. The tactical officers say the third shot was directed toward the officers.
2015-11-05	Laura Lemieux (36)	White	Goose Creek, SC	
2015-11-05	Jacob Hohman (30)	White	Lakeshire, MO	
2015-11-05	David Michael Romanoski (48)	White	West Virginia (Morgantown)	Romonaski was killed in his home while police were executing search-and-arrest warrants in a first-degree robbery investigation. Police said 2 women and a teenage boy were in the home and complied with deputies. Investigators believe the shots fired on Romonaski were from one deputy. Romonaski was armed with a shotgun and handgun at the time of the shooting, according to police.
2015-11-05	James Wayne Bigley (20)	White	Hominy, OK	
2015-11-04	John Edward Allen (57)	Black	Texas (Houston)	
2015-11-04	Faisal Mohammad (18)	Asian	California (Merced)	Faisal Mohammad was shot dead by UC Merced police after stabbing and injuring four people on campus.
2015-11-04	Timothy Gene Smith (47)	White	California (San Diego)	A San Diego Police officer spotted Smith, a wanted felon, and pursued him on foot with the help of a police helicopter Smith. Smith did not surrender as ordered but continued to try to evade officers. When Smith reached into his pocket an officer shot Smith in the torso, fatally wounding him. No weapon was found on Smith.
2015-11-04	Joseph M. Tyndall (30)	White	Springfield, MO	
2015-11-03	Mardis, Jeremy (6)	White	Louisiana (Marksville)	Multiple marshals opened fire on a vehicle, killing a 6-year-old boy and wounding his father, who was the driver of the car. Four days later, two marshals were arrested and charged with second-degree murder and attempted murder.
2015-11-02	James Covington Jr. (62)	Black	Washington, DC	
2015-11-01	Luverne Roy Christensen (49)	White	Hutchinson, MN	
2015-11-01	Alonzo Smith (27)	Black	Washington, DC	
2015-11-01	Killian Shane O'Quinn (20)	White	California (Eureka)	When pulled over by a California Highway Patrol officer for a traffic stop, O'Quinn exited his vehicle and shot the officer in the leg. The officer, Steve Curtis, returned fire, killing O'Quinn.
2015-11-01	Jack Yantis (62)	White	Idaho (Council)	Rancher shot dead by sheriff's deputies while putting down stray bull, conflicting info from police and witness

== See also ==
- Death in custody § United States
- Henry A. Wallace Police Crime Public Database
- List of cases of police brutality
- List of countries with annual rates and counts for killings by law enforcement officers
- List of law enforcement officers killed in the line of duty in the United States
- List of law enforcement officers convicted for an on-duty killing in the United States
- List of shootings by US immigration agents
- List of police reforms related to the George Floyd protests
- List of unarmed African Americans killed by law enforcement officers in the United States
- Lists of killings by law enforcement officers
- Police brutality in the United States
- Police misconduct § United States
- Police riot § United States
- Police use of deadly force in the United States
