= Pattern-oriented modeling =

Pattern-oriented modeling (POM) is an approach to bottom-up complex systems analysis that was developed to model complex ecological and agent-based systems. A goal of POM is to make ecological modeling more rigorous and comprehensive.

A traditional ecosystem model attempts to approximate the real system as closely as possible. POM proponents posit that an ecosystem is so information-rich that an ecosystem model will inevitably either leave out relevant information or become over-parameterized and lose predictive power. Through a focus on only the relevant patterns in the real system, POM offers a meaningful alternative to the traditional approach.

An attempt to mimic the scientific method, POM requires the researcher to begin with a pattern found in the real system, posit hypotheses to explain the pattern, and then develop predictions that can be tested. A model used to determine the original pattern may not be used to test the researcher's predictions. Through this focus on the pattern, the model can be constructed to include only information relevant to the question at hand.

POM is also characterized by an effort to identify the appropriate temporal and spatial scale at which to study a pattern, and to avoid the assumption that a single process might explain a pattern at multiple temporal or spatial scales. It does, however, offer the opportunity to look explicitly at how processes at multiple scales might be driving a particular pattern.

A look at the trade-offs between model complexity and payoff can be considered in the framework of the Medawar zone. The model is considered too simple if it addresses a single problem (e.g., the explanation behind a single pattern), whereas it will be considered too complex if it incorporates all the available biological data. The Medawar zone, where the payoff in what is learned is greatest, is at an intermediate level of model complexity.

== Usage ==
Pattern-oriented modeling has been used to test a priori hypotheses on how herdsman decide which farmers to contract with when grazing their cattle. Herdsman behavior followed the pattern predicted by a 'friend' rather than 'cost' priority hypothesis.
