= Imam Mahdi Mosque =

Mosque in Riqqa, Kuwait City, Kuwait

- امام مہدی مسجد

Religion
- Affiliation: Shia Islam
- Ecclesiastical or organizational status: Mosque
- Status: Active

Location
- Location: Riqqah
- Country: Kuwait

Architecture
- Completed: 1995

Specifications
- Dome: 1
- Minaret: 2

The Imam Mahdi Mosque (Arabic: امام مہدی مسجد) is a Shi'a mosque located in Riqqah, Kuwait. It was built in 1995.

== See also ==
- List of mosques in Kuwait
- Islam in Kuwait
