= Imam Hussain Mosque =

Imam Hussain Mosque may refer to:

- Imam Husayn Shrine, Kerbala, Iraq, the burial site of Husayn ibn Ali
- Imam Hussein Mosque (Kuwait), the largest Shia mosque in Kuwait
- Imam Hussein Mosque (Baku), Azerbaijan
- Imam Hussein Mosque (Marneuli), Georgia
