= Brouillette =

Brouillette is a surname of French origin. People with this name include:

- Dan Brouillette (born 1962), American politician and businessman
- Geneviève Brouillette (born 1969), French Canadian television and film actress
- Jason Brouillette, see Shooting of Jeremy Mardis
- Jessica Brouillette (born 1995), a Canadian freestyle wrestler
- Julien Brouillette (born 1986), a Canadian former professional ice hockey player
- Marc-Olivier Brouillette (born 1986), a retired Canadian football linebacker
- Matthew Brouillette (born 1969), an American businessman and entrepreneur
- Pierre-A. Brouillette (born 1951), a Quebec politician and businessman
- Richard Brouillette (born 1970), a Quebec film producer, director, editor and programmer
