= List of mosques in Kuwait =

The is a list of mosques in Kuwait.

As of 2024, Kuwait had 1,828 mosques distributed across all the country's governorates. The following is a list of the most notable mosques.

Name	Images	City	Year	Remarks
Al Othman Mosque in Jebla		Kuwait City	1857	
Al Othman Mosque		Hawalli	1958	
Imam Hussein Mosque		Kuwait City	1986	
Grand Mosque		Kuwait City	1986	
Imam Baqir Mosque		Surra, Kuwait City	2007	
Imam Mahdi Mosque		Riqqah, Kuwait City	1995	
Al Maylem Mosque		Kuwait City	2007	
Alghanimkharafi mosque		Sulaibikhat	2021	
Adyla Al Bahar Mosque		Al Mesayel	2024	
Bader Al-Mailam Mosque		Kuwait City		
Siddiqa Fatima Zahra Mosque		Dahiya Abdullah Mubarak City	2008	

== See also ==
- Lists of mosques
- Islam in Kuwait
