= John Leopold =

John Leopold may refer to,

- John R. Leopold (born 1943), American politician in Maryland
- John L. Leopold (born 1965), American politician in Santa Cruz County, California

== See also ==
- Johann Leopold (disambiguation)
