= Mardi Gras (disambiguation) =

Mardi Gras refers to events of the Carnival celebrations, beginning on or after Epiphany, and culminating on the day before Ash Wednesday, also known as Shrove Tuesday.

Mardi Gras may also refer to:

== Festivals ==
- Mardi Gras in Mobile, annual Carnival festival held in Mobile, Alabama
- New Orleans Mardi Gras, annual Carnival festival held in New Orleans, Louisiana
  - Mardi Gras throws, strings of beads, doubloons, cups, and other trinkets typical of the New Orleans Mardi Gras
- Sydney Gay and Lesbian Mardi Gras, at one stage temporarily the Sydney Mardi Gras, a gay pride parade held annually in Sydney, Australia

== Business and transportation ==
- Mardi Gras (ship), three ships bearing the name
- Mardi Gras, a line of napkins (and formerly, paper towels) made by Georgia-Pacific
- Mardi Gras Service, an Amtrak passenger train between New Orleans, Louisiana, and Mobile, Alabama

== Arts, entertainment, and media ==
=== Film ===
- Mardi Gras (1943 film), a short
- Mardi Gras (1958 film), a musical starring Pat Boone
- Mardi Gras: Spring Break, a 2011 American film starring Carmen Electra

=== Music ===
- Mardi Gras (album), a 1972 album by Creedence Clearwater Revival
- Mardi Gras (EP), a 2010 EP by Cowboy Mouth
- Mardi Gras (music group), a New York City based rock'n'roll band successful in the early 1970s in Europe
- "Mardi Gras", a 1977 song by Gino Vanelli from A Pauper in Paradise
- "Mardi Gras", a 2016 song by Dierks Bentley, featuring Trombone Shorty, from Black (Dierks Bentley album)
- "Take Me to the Mardi Gras", a 1973 song by Paul Simon, covered by Bob James

== People ==
- Mardi Gras Indians, African-American Carnival revelers in New Orleans, Louisiana, who dress up as Native Americans
- Edgar Pearce, (born 1937/38), the "Mardi Gra bomber", responsible for a terror campaign in London during the mid-1990s

== See also ==
- MardiGrass, a cannabis-law reform festival held in the town of Nimbin, in north east New South Wales, Australia
- Mardi (disambiguation)
