= Grand Mosque of Kuwait =

Mosque in Kuwait City, Kuwait

Grand Mosque
- المسجد الكبير
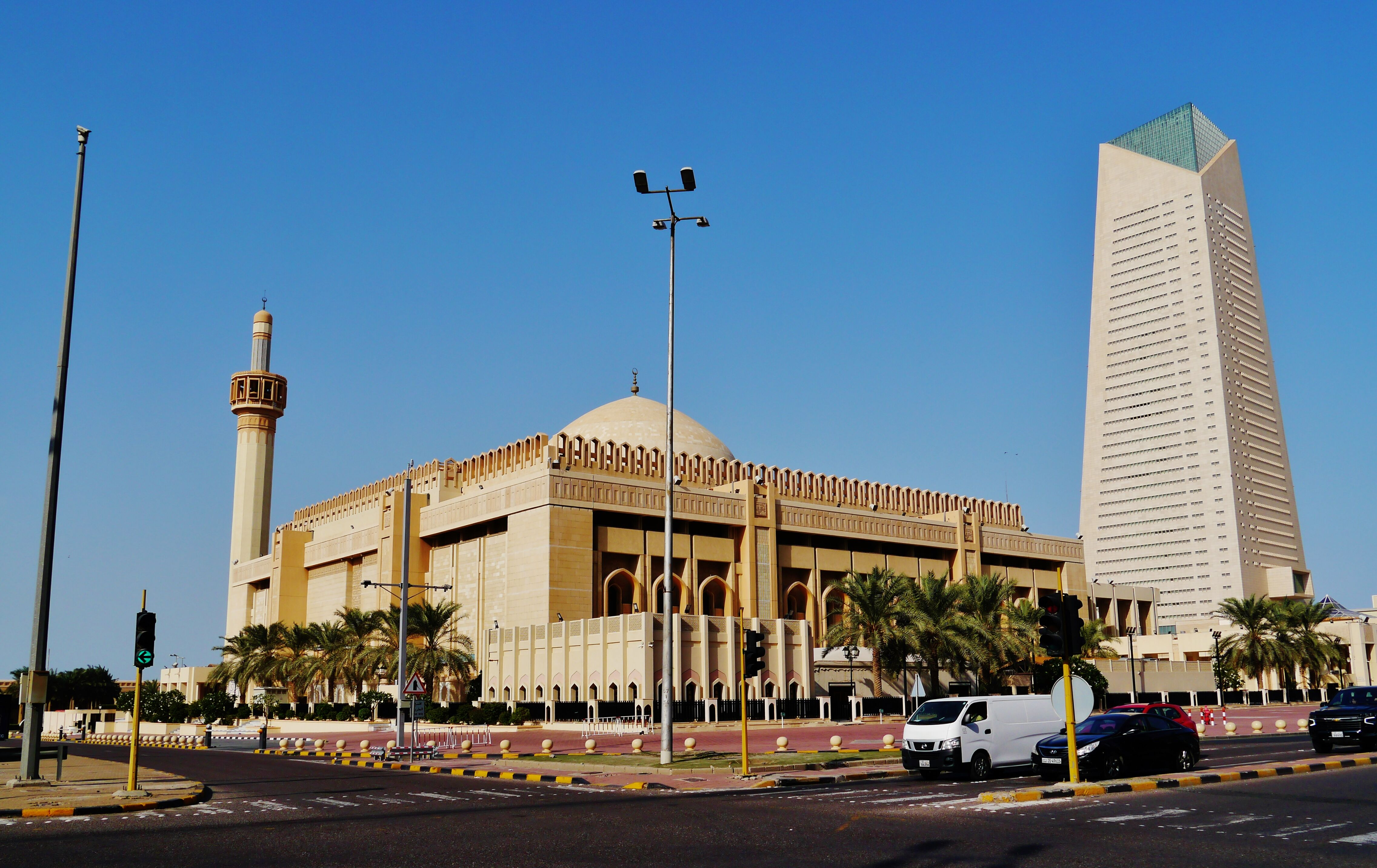

- Location of the mosque in Kuwait

Religion
- Affiliation: Islam
- Ecclesiastical or organisational status: Mosque
- Status: Active

Location
- Location: Kuwait City
- Country: Kuwait
- Interactive map of Grand Mosque
- Coordinates: 29°22′44″N 47°58′29″E

Architecture
- Completed: 1407 AH (1986/1987 CE)
- Construction cost: 13 million KWD (US$48.6 million)

Specifications
- Capacity: 11,000
- Interior area: 20,000 m^{2} (220,000 sq ft)
- Dome: 1
- Dome height (outer): 43 m (141 ft)
- Dome dia. (outer): 26 m (85 ft)
- Minaret: 1
- Minaret height: 74 m (243 ft)

The Grand Mosque (Arabic: المسجد الكبير), located in Kuwait City, is the largest mosque in Kuwait and 8th largest in the world. The mosque can host upto 150,000 worshippers during the month of Ramadan. Its area spans 45,000 square metres (480,000 sq ft), out of which the building itself covers 20,000 square metres (220,000 sq ft). The main prayer hall is 72 metres (236 ft) wide on all sides, and has teakwood doors. Natural lighting is provided by 144 windows.

== Overview ==
The dome of the mosque is 26 metres (85 ft) in diameter and 43 metres (141 ft) high, and is decorated with the Asma al-Husna, the 99 names of God. The mosque can accommodate up to 10,000 men in the main prayer hall, and up to 950 women in the separate hall for women. Construction of the mosque started in 1979, and the mosque was completed on the first of Shawwal in 1407 AH (1986/1987 CE), or Eid ul-Fitr. The mosque's minaret, located at the northwest corner, resembles Andalusian architecture.

The mosque was designed by the architect Mohammed Saleh Makiya, who combined Andalusian and oriental styles. Its foundations, columns, roofs and minaret are concrete, with an exterior of natural stone and an interior of marble, ceramics and plaster. According to the mosque's director, Ali Shaddad, the complex holds about 60,000 worshippers including its courtyards, and up to 150,000 during Ramadan. The mosque also has a hall for seminars, lectures and cultural and educational programs. It has two libraries, one for researchers, which displays an Ottoman Quran, and one with books in non-Arabic languages.

== Gallery ==
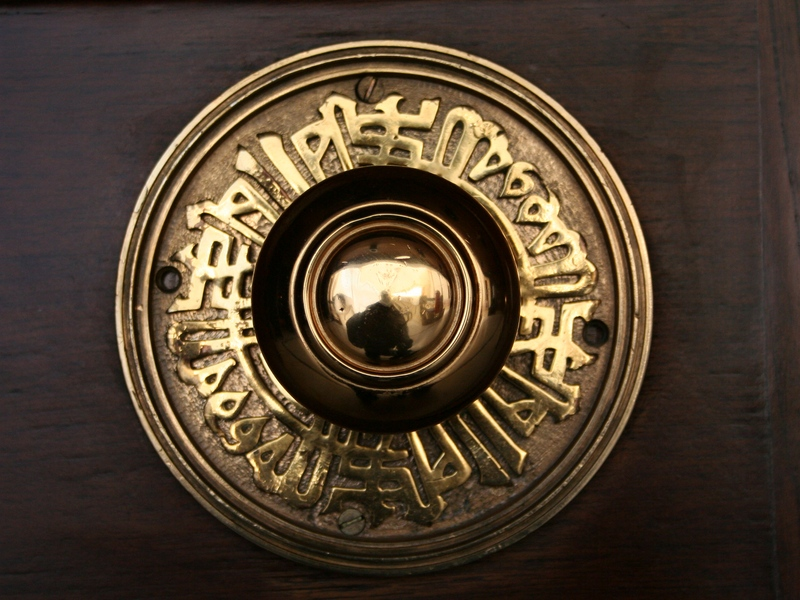

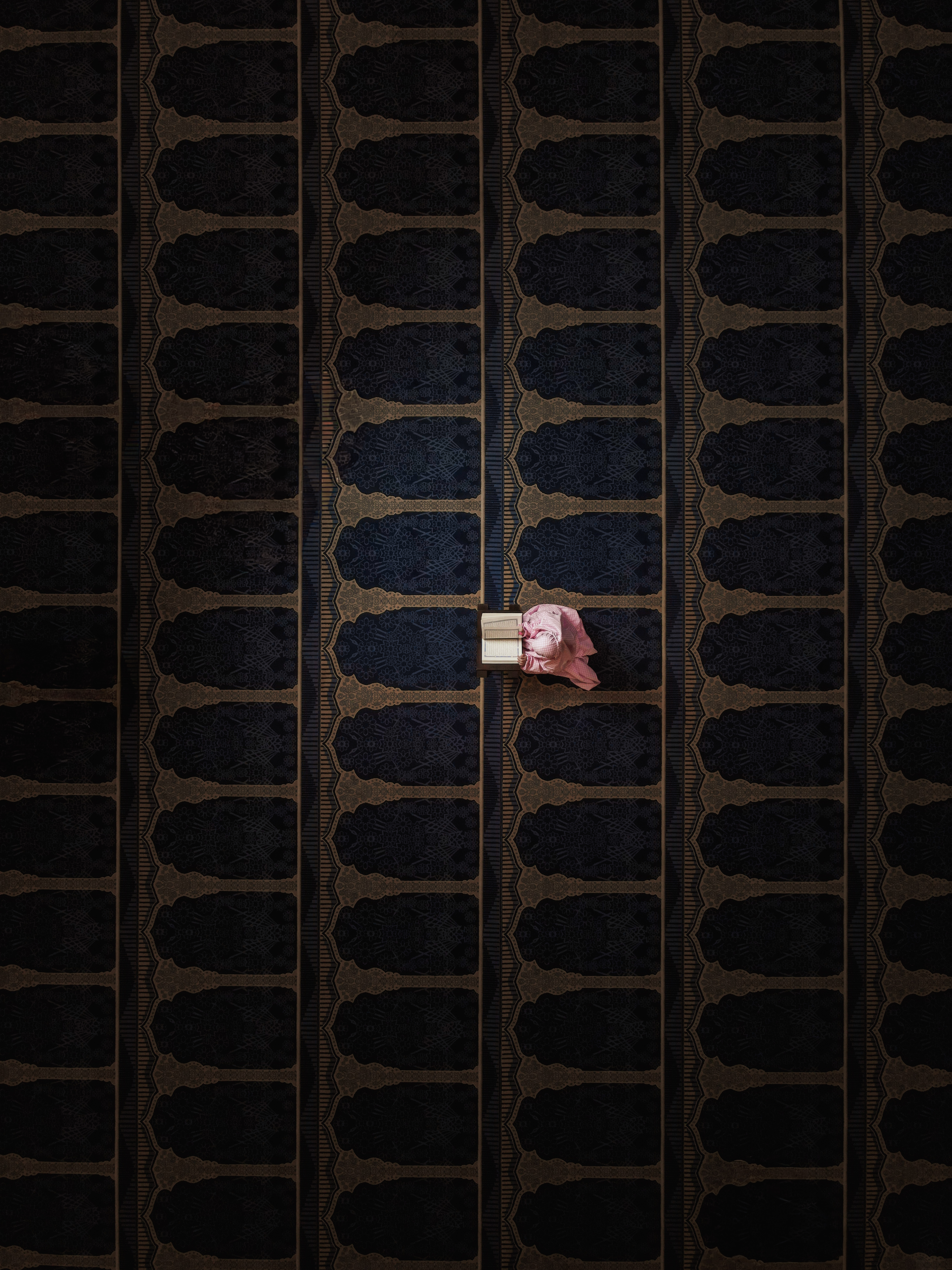

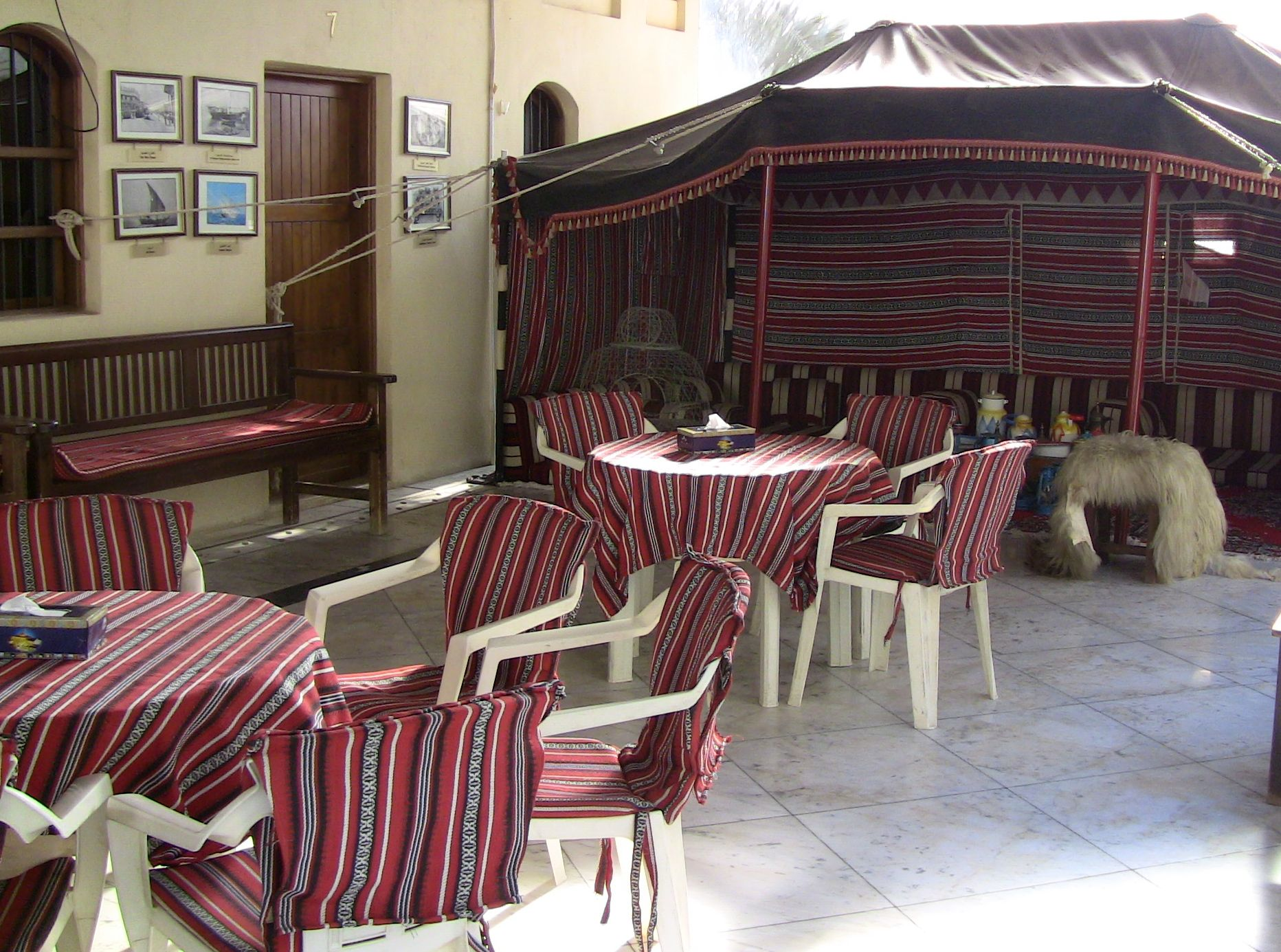

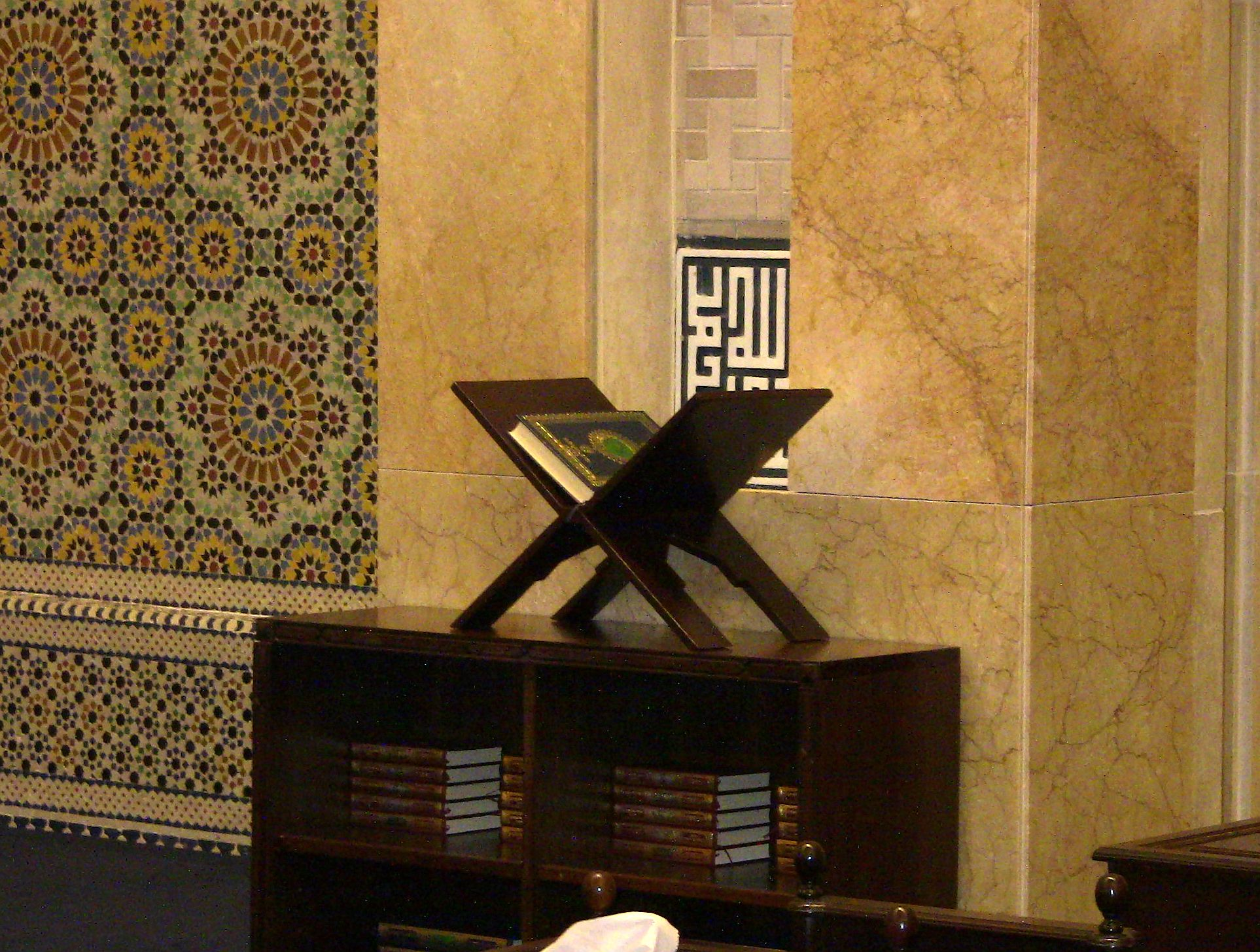

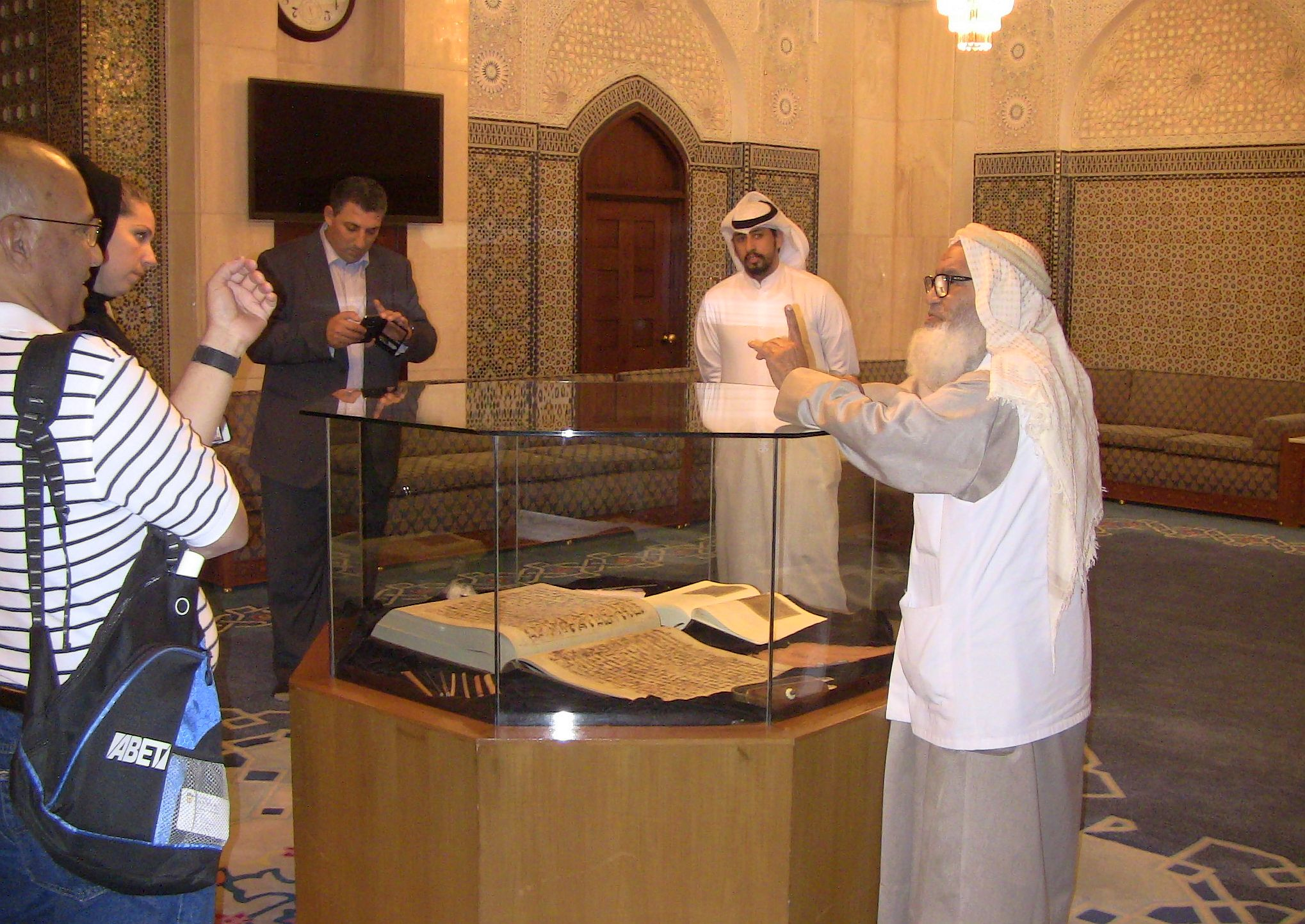

== See also ==
- List of mosques in Kuwait
- Islam in Kuwait
