= Mahdia (disambiguation) =

Mahdia is a city in Tunisia.

Mahdia may also refer to:

- Mahdia Governorate in Tunisia
- Mahdia, Guyana
- History of Mahdist Sudan
- Mehdya, a city in Morocco

Mahdiyya or al-Mahdiyya may refer to:

- The Fatimid caliphate of Abdullah al-Mahdi Billah (909–934)
- Mahdist Sudan (1885–1899)

== See also ==
- Mahdi (disambiguation)
- Mahdist (disambiguation)
- Mahdiyeh (disambiguation)
- Mehdiyan, a cemetery in Delhi, India
