= Imam Baqir Mosque =

Mosque in Surra, Kuwait

- Location of the mosque in Kuwait

Religion
- Affiliation: Shia Islam
- Ecclesiastical or organizational status: Mosque
- Status: Active

Location
- Location: Surra, Kuwait City
- Country: Kuwait
- Interactive map of Imam Baqir Mosque
- Coordinates: 29°22′07″N 47°58′25″E

Architecture
- Completed: 2007
- Construction cost: 340,000 KD

Specifications
- Capacity: 8,000 worshippers
- Dome: 4
- Minaret: 4

The Imam Baqir Mosque is a Shi'a mosque located in Surra, Kuwait City, Kuwait. The prayer hall for men holds 6,000 worshippers, and the women's prayer hall contains about 2,000. In 2011 the imam of the mosque was Sheikh Mustafa. Imam Baqir Mosque is one of the largest Shi'a mosques in Kuwait. For Friday prayer, most worshippers come in the afternoon. During the Maghreb prayer about 2,000 worshippers attend. Construction was started in 2005, and completed in 2007.

== See also ==
- List of mosques in Kuwait
- Islam in Kuwait
