= Johann Leopold =

Johann Leopold may refer to,

- Johann Leopold, Hereditary Prince of Saxe-Coburg and Gotha (1906–1972), eldest son of Charles Edward, Duke of Saxe-Coburg and Gotha and Princess Victoria Adelaide of Schleswig-Holstein-Sonderburg-Glücksburg
- Johann Leopold Theodor Friedrich Zincken (1770–1856), German entomologist
- Johann Leopold Zillmann (1830–1892), German missionary to Australia
- Johann Georg Leopold von Versen (1791–1868), German military and nobleman
- Johann Leopold Abel (1795–1871), German pianist and composer

== See also ==
- John Leopold (disambiguation)
