= John L. Leopold =

American politician (born 1965)

- Born: 1965 (age 60–61); United States
- Occupation: Politician
- Years active: 2008–2020

John L. Leopold was a supervisor in Santa Cruz County. He was elected in 2008, 2012, and 2016 to represent the First District. He is also a member of the Soquel Aptos Groundwater Management Committee. He is known for his stance against fracking.

== Background ==
=== Personal ===
Leopold was born in 1965 and comes from a background with a mother who had an involvement in various social justice issues. He is one of three brothers and two sisters and has a twin brother.

He is married to his wife Teresa and has two daughters. He currently lives in Live Oak.

=== Early years ===
At the age of 14 while still living in Harrisburg, Pennsylvania, he became involved in the anti-nuclear movement. This was in 1979 and a result of the Three Mile Island accident. In 1985 he left home to attend the University of Pittsburgh for two years. In 1986, he enrolled at UC Santa Cruz and graduated with a bachelor's degree in politics in 1988.

== Political career ==
He is a Santa Cruz County Democratic Party member. In November 2008, he was elected to the Santa Cruz County Board of Supervisors. In 2012, he was challenged by Gary Richard Arnold and Charles Andrew Paulden. Another contender Susan Weber had earlier withdrawn from the race. He won the election with 70 percent of the votes and was re elected. In 2020 he was then ousted by Manu Koenig, receiving 42.75% of the vote.

== Board membership ==
For 8 years he served on the Cabrillo College Governing Board. He is a member of the Soquel Aptos Groundwater Management Committee . He was a member of the Santa Cruz Local Agency Formation Commission board until 2013 when he was removed. This was done on the recommendation of Commission Chair Neal Coonerty.
