= Mardis =

Mardis is a surname. Notable people with the surname include:

- Elaine Mardis (born 1962), American geneticist
- Samuel Wright Mardis (1800–1836), American politician

== See also ==
- Killing of Jeremy Mardis
- Marris
