= Ryan Coonerty =

American politician

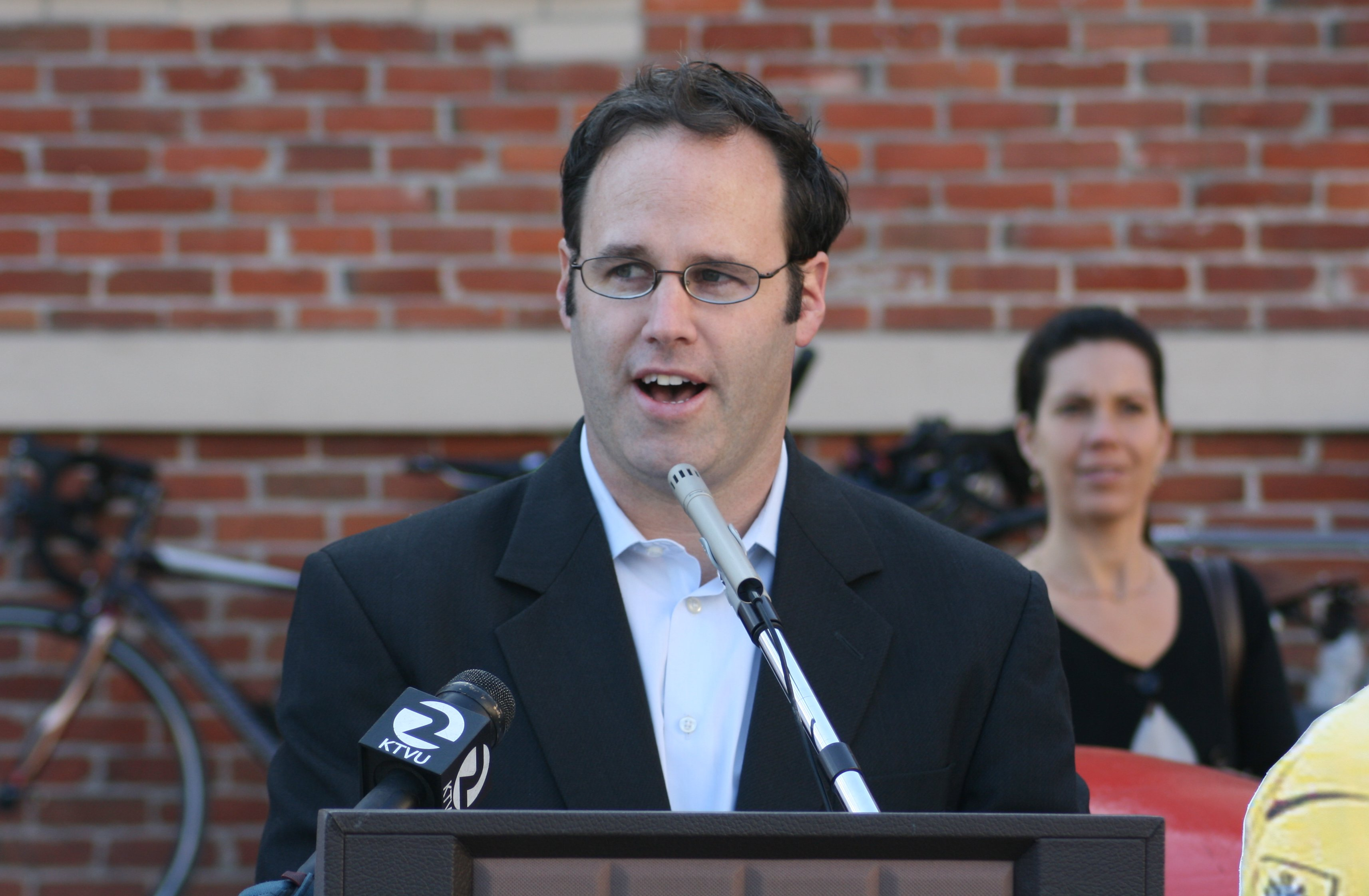
- Coonerty in 2008

Third District Supervisor for Santa Cruz County
- In office January 2015 – January 2023
- Preceded by: Neal Coonerty
- Succeeded by: Justin Cummings

Personal details
- Spouse: Emily Bernard Coonerty
- Education: University of Oregon (B.A.); London School of Economics (M.A.); University of Virginia School of Law (J.D.)
- Profession: Politician, businessman, lecturer, author
- Website: http://www.ryancoonerty.com/

Ryan Coonerty is an American politician, businessman, lecturer, and author who served as the Third District Supervisor for California's Santa Cruz County, representing western portions of the county including Santa Cruz, Bonny Doon, and Davenport. Coonerty twice previously served as Mayor of Santa Cruz, the county seat of Santa Cruz County, in 2008 and 2011. In addition to holding elected office, Coonerty co-founded NextSpace Coworking, and is a lecturer for the Legal Studies department at the University of California, Santa Cruz and the Panetta Institute for Public Policy at CSU Monterey Bay. He is the author of Etched in Stone: Enduring Words From Our Nation's Monuments, published by the National Geographic Society (NGS) and co-author of The Rise of the Naked Economy - How to Benefit from the Changing Workplace, published by Macmillan-Palgrave. He is the cohost of An Honorable Profession, a NewDEAL Leaders’ podcast profiling emerging leaders in the Democratic Party, including Pete Buttigieg, Adrian Fontes and Mallory McMorrow.

== Background ==
Ryan Coonerty graduated from Santa Cruz's public school system and attended the University of Oregon, where he graduated from the Honors College. He received a master's degree from the London School of Economics and a J.D. degree from the University of Virginia School of Law. Prior to attending law school, he managed a school bond campaign for Santa Cruz City Schools that raised $86 million to repair and remodel school facilities. He also served as an outreach coordinator for Assemblyman Fred Keeley. Following law school, he served as legislative counsel for the Markle Foundation Task Force on National Security in the Information Age in Washington, D.C. In 2000, he was on the professional staff for the National Commission on Federal Election Reform. Coonerty has been involved in community activities including serving on the board of the Santa Cruz Community Credit Union, Dientes Community Dental Care, Santa Cruz Education Foundation, and the Locally Owned Business Alliance.

Coonerty was integral to the founding of PredPol, a predictive policing company, and served as the Director of Government Relations and Strategy.

== Teaching ==
Coonerty began his teaching career at the University of California, Santa Cruz in 2003 as a lecturer in the Legal Studies department where he has taught several courses on democracy and constitutional law. Additionally, Coonerty is a frequent visiting instructor at the Panetta Institute for Public Policy at California State University, Monterey Bay. Coonerty was selected to be a fellow for the UC National Center for Free Speech and Civic Engagement in 2021. During the fellowship, he developed a curriculum about the Skokie free speech case.

== Politics ==
=== Mayor and City Council ===
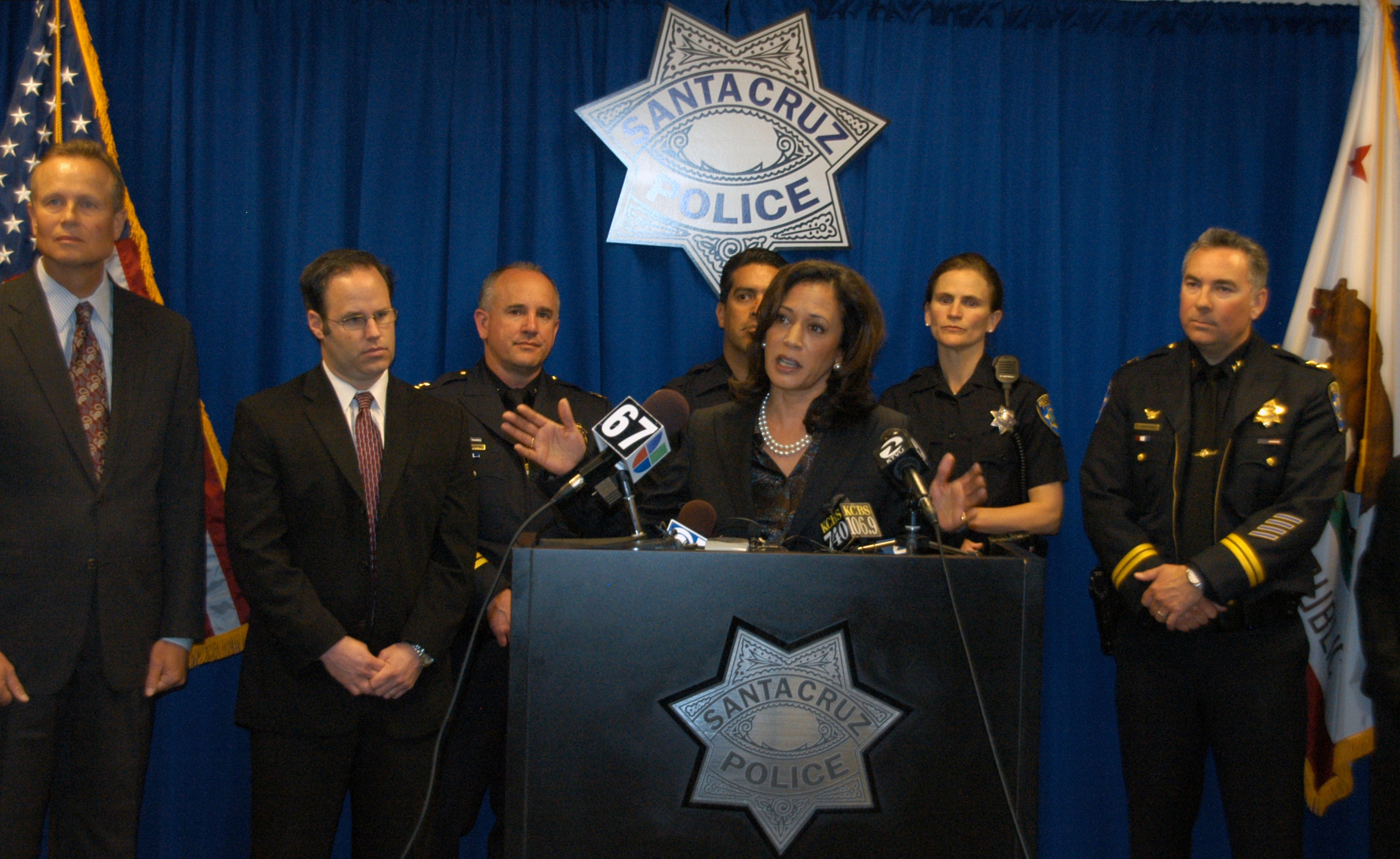
Coonerty and State Attorney General Kamala Harris gathered for a press conference at police headquarters on March 15, 2011

In 2004 and again in 2008, Coonerty was elected to four-year terms on the Santa Cruz City Council, finishing first in a field of 10 candidates in 2008. Coonerty additionally served as mayor twice during his time on the city council, in 2008 and 2011.

As part of his responsibilities as mayor, Coonerty served as the lead city negotiator in an agreement with the University of California Santa Cruz related to their Long Range Development Plan. The agreement ended half a dozen lawsuits. The agreement was adopted unanimously by the City Council, County Board of Supervisors, and a citizen group. For this effort, he was profiled as a Santa Cruz Sentinel Newsmaker of the Year in 2008. He also coauthored the Clean Oceans, Rivers and Beaches initiative which passed as an initiative in the November 2008 election.

He served a second one-year term as mayor in 2011. During his term, he worked to balance the city budget, launch the Mayor's Academy, and appoint a Technology Task Force to improve the use of technology by the city. As a result of this effort, Code for America selected Santa Cruz as one of its six partner cities for 2012. He additionally played a key role in 2012 in recruiting the NBA G-League Santa Cruz Warriors to Santa Cruz.

Some of Coonerty's efforts have received national attention, including the creation of an Ayuda Linea (Help Line) for day laborers to report incidents of abuse, and a policy to invest part of the city's reserve funds in local financial institutions, an effort praised by the National Center for Local Sustainability. Coonerty also founded Santa Cruz NEXT, a non-partisan organization dedicated to engaging the next generation of Santa Cruz in the civic life of the community. In 2008, he was selected "as one of the nation’s most promising young leaders" to be a Rodel Fellow in Public Leadership at the Aspen Institute.

=== Board of Supervisors ===
Coonerty was elected to the Board of Supervisors in 2014 and 2018, capturing 76% and 78% of the vote respectively.

In February 2015, Coonerty and fellow supervisor Bruce McPherson wrote new regulations designed to incentivize small and affordable housing by requiring construction projects to pay higher fees into a fund providing grants for affordable housing as well as more funding for childcare facilities. In June 2015, Coonerty wrote a letter subsequently approved by the Board of Supervisors requesting the county withdraw investments from banks that have pleaded guilty to committing felonies, an initiative that won praise from Robert Reich. Coonerty led the effort to establish a local Nurse-Family Partnership Program and a Thrive by Three Fund to support families' health and educational outcomes.

During his time as supervisor, Coonerty has led the expansion of the Thrive by 5 initiative to support low income moms and their children as well as the Community Partnership for Accountability, Connection and Treatment (PACT), a collaborative anti-crime project between government and nonprofits that focuses on improving outcomes for repeat offenders. In 2015, PACT was awarded the National Association of Counties Achievement Award for excellence in public safety.

Coonerty also helped manage the response and recovery efforts surrounding the CZU Fire. Following the fire, he and McPherson established the County Office of Response, Recovery and Resilience in order improve recovery efforts and increase preparedness for future disasters.

== Publications ==
Coonerty is the author of a book from National Geographic, entitled Etched in Stone – Enduring Words From Our Nation’s Monuments. The book chronicles America's aspirations by surveying the words engraved in 50 public spaces across the United States. The book features a foreword by historian Douglas Brinkley and photos from photographer Carol M. Highsmith.

In 2013, Coonerty and Jeremy Neuner, with whom Coonerty cofounded NextSpace, released The Rise of the Naked Economy – How to Benefit from the Changing Workplace, in which the coauthors recommend ways to benefit from a modern uptick in freelance work based on their experiences with NextSpace. The book received praise from Zappos CEO Tony Hsieh, editor and professor Richard Florida, and author Walter Isaacson.

In 2019, Coonerty gave a TEDxSantaCruz talk about finding hope in local government.
