= Mahdaviat =

Mahdaviat (Persian: مهدويت) is a religious term in Shia Islam translating to "Mahdiism" or "belief in the Mahdi". It may refer to

- Mahdiism in Islam in general
- the Mahdavia ("Mahdiist") sect established in India in the 16th century

== See also ==
- People claiming to be the Mahdi
- Mahdavi (disambiguation)
- Mahdi (disambiguation)
