= Mahdiyeh, Khuzestan =

Mahdiyeh مهديه
- Village
- Location within Iran
- Coordinates: 31°50′21″N 48°59′12″E
- Country: Iran
- Province: Khuzestan
- County: Shushtar
- Bakhsh: Central
- Rural District: Miyan Ab

Population (2006)
  - Total: 80
- Time zone: UTC+3:30 (IRST)
  - Summer (DST): UTC+4:30 (IRDT)

Mahdiyeh (Persian: مهديه, also Romanized as Mahdīyeh) is a village in Miyan Ab Rural District, in the Central District of Shushtar County, Khuzestan Province, Iran. At the 2006 census, its population was 80, in 9 families.
