= Abbas Mahdi =

Iraqi politician and public servant

Abbas Mahdi (Arabic: عباس مهدي; born 14 September 1898, Baghdad-died 1961)was an Iraqi politician and public servant.

Mahdi was educated at Baghdad Law College and entered government service in 1918.

He held numerous official positions during his career, including Minister of Education (1932), Minister of Economics and Communications (1934), Minister of Economics (1937-38), Minister of Justice (1938), Deputy for Baghdad (1938), Director General of Customs & Excise (1941), and Iraqi Envoy Extraordinary and Minister Plenipotentiary to U.S.S.R.
