= Mardi, Medak district =

Mardi (Mareda)
- village
- Location in Telangana, India
- Coordinates: 18.19°N 77.81°E
- Country: India
- State: Andhra Pradesh
- District: Medak district

Population (2011)
  - Total: 7,000

Languages
  - Official: Telugu
- Time zone: UTC+5:30 (IST)
- PIN: 502287
- Telephone code: 08456
- Vehicle registration: AP23
- Nearest city: Hyderabad, India
- Lok Sabha constituency: Zahirabad
- Vidhan Sabha constituency: Narayankhed

Mardi is a village in Kalher Mandal, Medak district of Telangana, India. It is 150 km to the north of Hyderabad.

== Geography ==
Mardi is located at .It has an average elevation of 442 metres (1450 feet).

== Demographics ==
As of 2011 India census, Mardi had a population of 7,000. Males constitute 50% of the population and females 50%. Mardi has an average literacy rate of 76%: male literacy is 84%, and female literacy is 67%. In Mardi, 13% of the population is under 6 years of age.

== History ==
Mardi, a historic village originally called Mareda, later it known as Mardi also, reached its pinnacle during the Kakatiya dynasty reign.
