= Mardi Gras (ship) =

Three vessels have been named Mardi Gras:

- Mardi Gras (1972), launched in 1960 as the liner Empress of Canada she was renamed on entering service with Carnival Cruise Line as a cruise ship in 1972. She was sold to Epirotiki in 1993 and scrapped in 2003 after a number of changes of both owner and name
- Mardi Gras (2006), a bulk carrier launched in 2006; she was renamed Anemos in 2018
- Mardi Gras (2020), a cruise ship launched in 2020 and the second Carnival Cruise Line ship to bear the name
