= Mahdiyeh, Fars =

Mahdiyeh مهديه
- Village
- Location within Iran
- Coordinates: 29°38′41″N 52°29′17″E
- Country: Iran
- Province: Fars
- County: Shiraz
- Bakhsh: Central
- Rural District: Derak

Population (2006)
  - Total: 2,206
- Time zone: UTC+3:30 (IRST)
  - Summer (DST): UTC+4:30 (IRDT)

Mahdiyeh (Persian: مهديه, also Romanized as Mahdīyeh; also known as Mehdīābād) is a village in Derak Rural District, in the Central District of Shiraz County, Fars province, Iran. At the 2006 census, its population was 2,206, in 533 families.
