= Mahdist =

Mahdist or Mahdism may refer to:

- Mahdist (follower), in the context of the Mahdi, the prophesied redeemer of Islam
- Mahdist State, or Mahdist Sudan, a state based on a religious and political movement launched in 1881 by Muhammad Ahmad bin Abdullah (later Muhammad al-Mahdi)
- Mahdist War, the 1881–99 war between the Mahdist Sudanese and the forces of the Khedivate of Egypt

== See also ==
- List of Mahdi claimants
- Mahdi (disambiguation)
- Mahdia (disambiguation)
