= Mehdiyeh, Chaharmahal and Bakhtiari =

Mehdiyeh مهديه
- Village
- Location within Iran
- Coordinates: 32°21′29″N 50°48′21″E
- Country: Iran
- Province: Chaharmahal and Bakhtiari
- County: Shahrekord
- Bakhsh: Central
- Rural District: Howmeh

Population (2006)
  - Total: 6,232
- Time zone: UTC+3:30 (IRST)
  - Summer (DST): UTC+4:30 (IRDT)

Mehdiyeh (Persian: مهديه, also Romanized as Mehdīyeh; also known as Zāneyān Pā’īn, Zānīān, Zānīān-e Pā’īn, and Zānīyān) is a village in Howmeh Rural District, in the Central District of Shahrekord County, Chaharmahal and Bakhtiari Province, Iran. At the 2006 census, its population was 6,232, in 1,519 families.
