= Not Without My Husband =

2006 memoir by Justine Harun-Mahdavi

- Author: Justine Harun-Mahdavi
- Original title: Nicht ohne meinen Mann
- Genre: Memoir
- Publisher: Casimir Katz
- Publication date: 2006
- Publication place: Germany
- Pages: 518 pp.
- ISBN: 978-3-938047-11-8
- OCLC: 85813370

Not Without My Husband (German: Nicht ohne meinen Mann) is a book written by Justine Harun-Mahdavi. The book is the memoir of Justine and her life as a German woman with her Persian (Iranian) husband, Masoud Harun-Mahdavi, in Iran before and after the 1979 Iranian Revolution. It responds to the negative account of Iran in Betty Mahmoody's bestselling 1987 memoir, Not Without My Daughter.

== About the author ==
Justine Harun-Mahdavi (née Haas; born 11 June 1945 in Morbach, Germany) is a German woman who lived in Iran between 1968 and 1979, and is the writer of the Not Without My Husband.

Not Without My Husband is a memoir which describes her life with her Persian (Iranian) husband Massoud Harun-Mahdavi and two children in Iran. The book offers a direct view of the Iranian society as seen by a Westerner.

Justine moved to Iran 1968 and lived with her husband Massoud Harun-Mahdavi and two children in different cities (mainly in Kerman, Mashhad, and Tehran) for more than eleven years. Her husband Masoud was in different political positions. He was twice the mayor of the holy city of Mashhad. He also was once mayor of the capital city, Tehran. Due to his popularity among the people, he was even a member of the new government during the first months of the Islamic Republic. But he soon understood that the theocratic regime was not on path to bring democracy and freedom to the Iranian people. So Justine and her family left Iran in September 1979. Her husband is an active and well known member of the democratic Iranian opposition called Jebhe Melli. She visited Iran together with her daughter and son again in 2000. Justine today lives in a town close to Munich in Germany. In Not Without My Husband, Justine pleads for freedom and democracy in Iran and for tolerance towards all nations, religions, and cultures in the world.

== See also ==
- Persian culture
- Without My Daughter
