= Mardi Wormhoudt =

American politician (1937–2009)

- Born: October 1, 1937; United States
- Died: October 21, 2009 (aged 72); Santa Cruz
- Occupation: Politician
- Known for: Third District Supervisor for the County of Santa Cruz, Mayor of Santa Cruz

Mardi Wormhoudt (née Rolfs) (October 1, 1937 – October 21, 2009) was a politician and social worker.

== Personal ==
She was born in Milwaukee, Wisconsin to Daniel and Mary Jane Rolfs. When she was four the family moved to Chicago and then later, Paso Robles, California. Some time later they moved to San Francisco. She graduated from California State University, Los Angeles in June 1967. Wormhoudt was a social worker in Los Angeles, California. She married Ken Wormhoudt who she met in San Francisco. She was the mother of three boys Zachary, Jonathan, Jacob and a daughter Lisa. Ken, her husband died in 1997. They lived in Santa Cruz, California.

=== Death ===
She died on October 21, 2009, aged 72.

== Professional ==
She sat on the Santa Cruz City Council from 1981 to 1990. She was elected Mayor on three occasions. One term included the time after the 1989 Loma Prieta earthquake which was a very trying time. She was first elected to the Santa Cruz County Board of Supervisors in 1994. She was the Third District county supervisor for 12 years. In 2006, she made a public announcement that she intended to retire. Neal Coonerty ran for the position and was voted in.

=== Medical marijuana ===
On April 23, 2003 she and very sick patients were part of a protest held on the steps of the Santa Cruz County Courthouse to announce the filing of a suit against the federal government on behalf of patients who need medical marijuana. This was in response to the federal government's raiding a local medical marijuana collective. This was the first time such a suit had been launched.
