= Mahdi Falahati =

Iranian television presenter and writer

Mehdi Falahati
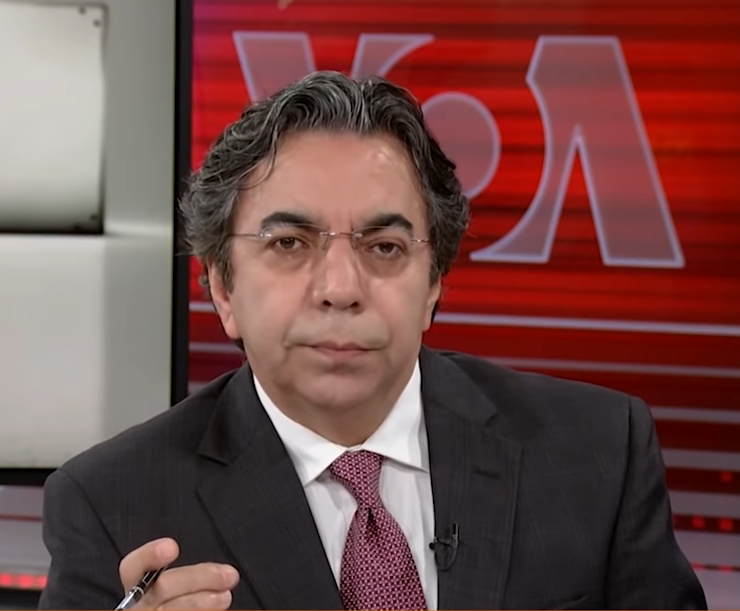
- Mehdi Falahati
- Born: Mehdi Falahati; 1958 (age 67–68); Imperial State of Iran
- Education: Bachelor of Political science
- Occupations: writer, political expert, television presenter and poet

Mehdi Falahati (Persian: مهدی فلاحتی; born 1958) is an Iranian writer, political expert, television presenter, and poet. Since May 2012, he has been presenting a TV show named Civil Society and Last Page in Voice of America Persian News Network. Falahati joined the VOA Persian service in 2008, and now he works as writer and anchor for Civil Society and Last Page; a weekly show that is one of the most-viewed satellite TV programs in Iran and abroad. He formerly worked for Radio Free Europe, one of the five networks under the USAGM.

== Authorship ==
In addition to his television activities, Falahati has published his poems. He is also familiar with the Indian language and has translated Pritish Nandy poems into Persian.
