= Mehdi Araghi =

Iranian terrorist (1930–1979)

- Born: 1930
- Died: 26 August 1979 (aged 48–49)
- Resting place: Fatima Masumeh Shrine
- Occupation: Political leader
- Known for: Founder of Fadayan-e Islam

Mehdi Araghi (Persian: مهدی عراقی; 1930 – 26 August 1979) was a founder of Fadayan-e Islam. He and a friend had participated in Hassan-Ali Mansur's assassination, and he was kept in prison during the Shah's regime until the 1979 Iranian Revolution. After the revolution he was in charge of the Qasr Prison in Tehran, the prison from which he had recently been freed. He was assassinated by the Forqan Group on 26 August 1979.
