= Mohammad Mahdi Jafari =

Iranian athlete and martial artist

Mohammad Mahdi jafar
Personal information
- Born: 19 December 1964 (age 61) Tehran, Iran
Medal record
Representing Iran
Silver medal – second place	Kumite team	New zealand 1991
Bronze medal – third place	Kumite individual	New Zealand 1991
Gold medal – first place	Kumite team	Iran 1989
Bronze medal – third place	Kumite individual	Iran 191
Silver medal – second place	Kumite individual	Iran 1991
Silver medal – second place	Kumite individual	Iran 1992
Gold medal – first place	Kumite individual	Iran 1988
Gold medal – first place	Kumite individual	Iran 1991
Gold medal – first place	Shotokan	Japan 2019

Mohammad Mahdi Jafari (Persian: محمدمهدی جعفری; also Romanized as "Mohammad-Mahdī Ja’farī"; born 19 December 1964 in Tehran) is an Iranian karateka, a previous member of National Iranian Karate Team and managing director of 21st Century Cinematic “Cultural & Artistic Institute”.

Jafari set out for his sport activities first in 1978 with Kung Fu. His activities of artistic nature commenced in 2001 which was followed by obtaining a license from Ministry of Islamic Guidance & Culture and starting the operations at 21st Century Cinematic, Cultural & Artistic Institute in 2002.

His activity in karate was started in 1979 at Academy of Karate on Takht-e-Tavoos (Motahari) Avenue supervised by his master, Alireza Soleimani, who continued supervising his practice at Payam, 22 Bahman, Shintu, and Unknown Martyrs clubs after the academy had been closed in 1980.

He was a member of the Iranian National Karate Team in 1987.

== Awards obtained within first round of Karate activities ==
- Participation in world championships, Granada, Spain 1992; Asian- Oceanian competitions in Australia 1989; New Zealand 1999....; world championship of shitu ryu style, Japan 1993 and international competitions:
- Silver medal of Asian – Ocean Team championship, New Zealand 1991
- Bronze medal of Asian- Oceanian Individual Championship Competitions, New Zealand 1991
- Gold medal of Vahdat International Cup team competitions, 1988.
- Bronze medal of Fajr Decade International Individual competitions 1990, 80 kg.
- Silver medal of Fajr Decade International Individual competitions, 1990- Free weight.
- Silver medal of Fajr Decade International Individual competitions 1991- Free weight
- Three awards of first position in the state championship individual competitions, 90 kg and free weight in 1987, 1988- 1990 and 1991.
- Five awards of Tehran individual championships.
- Numerous awards of district competitions and championship award of Tehran clubs.
- Holder of coaching diploma from Karate Federation and letter of appreciation in 1990.

Leaving karate activities in 1991

Returning to karate: After 17 years in 2018 and restarting the exercises.

== The awards obtained since second round of karate activities ==
- Participation in W.S.K.F. world competitions of Shuton style in summer 2019 of +55 age group + ippon kumite and obtaining gold medal of the competitions in addition to bronze medal of the same competitions and +45 age group + Giu Kumite.
- Participation in Iran Zamin International competitions 2019 and obtaining the gold medal in accompaniment of Dal (Eagle) team with presence of world champions namely Saman Heydari, Mehdi Khodabakhshi and Ali Meskini; coaching by Amir Valadkhani and with Ehsan Heydari as head coach; the event that resulted in defeat of national team of South Korea within final competitions.
- Bearer of dan 8 of shitu ryu style-Iran; Dan7 of world Shuto Kan style and class I coaching certificate from Karate Federation.
