= Mahdi Tajik =

- Born: July 11, 1981 (age 44); Tehran, Iran
- Occupation: Journalist-political prisoner politically active

Mahdi Tajik (born 1981, Tehran) is an Iranian students’ activist, journalist and political prisoner. He was arrested for the first time in 2005 by the security forces. He was also arrested by the Iranian Revolutionary Guards in 2006, for founding a student activist organization. In the same year, the Revolutionary Court sentenced him to two and a half years in prison which was reduced to cash surcharge afterwards.

Mahdi Tajik was arrested a third in January 2010 and transferred to the section 350 of Evin prison. He was sentenced to 27 months of prison and 30 years of prohibition from any interview, journalism, writing articles, membership and political activity in any political parties. He also begins serving his sentence on 12 Feb 2013 and released on furlough on 05 Oct 2013.
