= Märdi, Võru County =

Village in Estonia

- Village
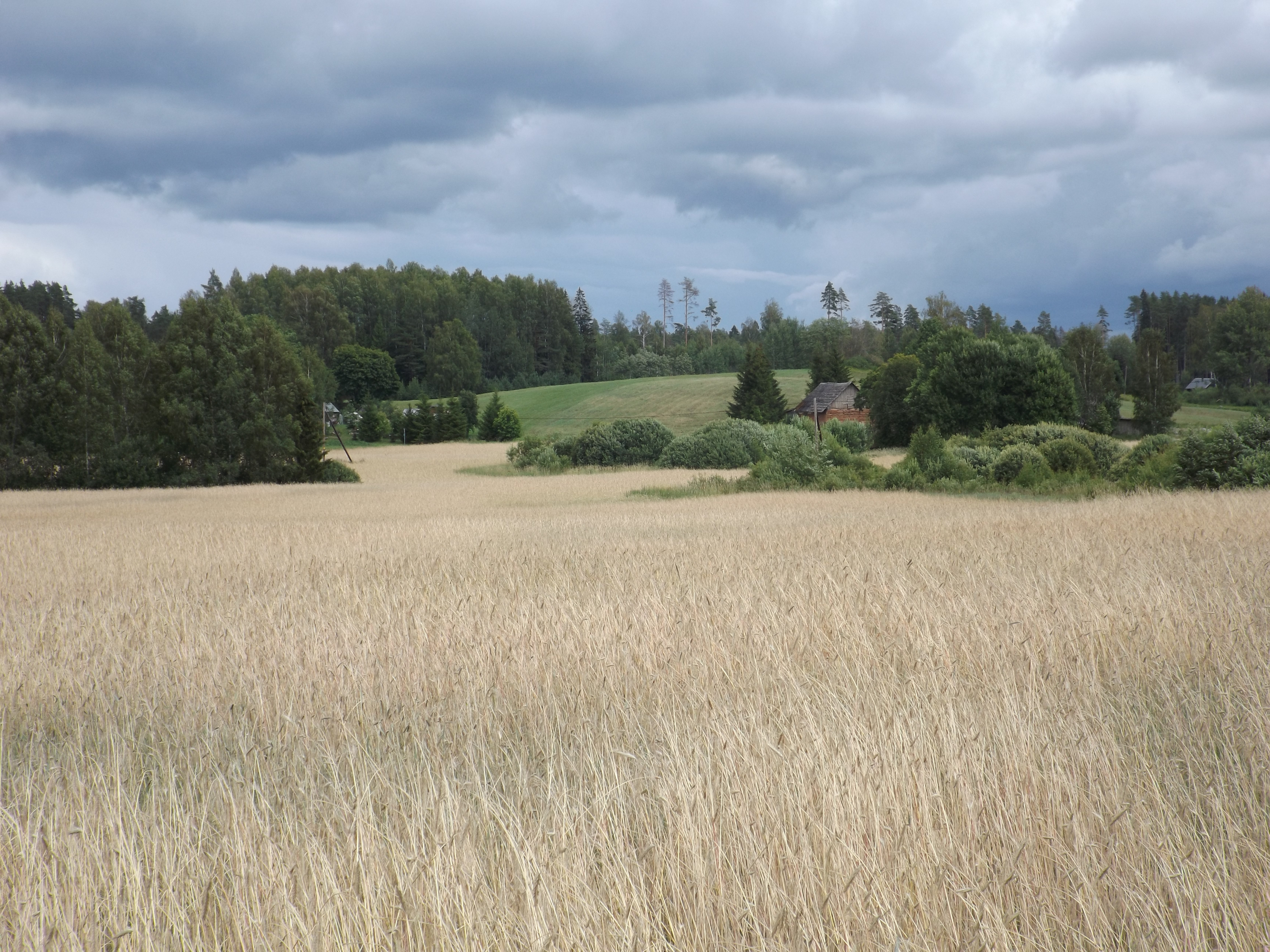
- Farmland in Märdi

- Location within Estonia
- Coordinates: 57.686388888889°N 26.908055555556°E
- Country: Estonia
- County: Võru County
- Parish: Rõuge Parish
- Time zone: UTC+2 (EET)
  - Summer (DST): UTC+3 (EEST)

Märdi is a village in Rõuge Parish, Võru County in Estonia.
