= Mahdi El Khammasi =

Qatari footballer (born 1987)

Personal information
- Full name: Mahdi El Khammasi
- Date of birth: 8 May 1987 (age 39)
- Place of birth: Qatar
- Height: 1.72 m (5 ft 7 1/2 in)
- Position: Right-back

Senior career*
Years	Team	Apps	(Gls)
2008–2011	Qatar		
2011–2021	Al-Kharaitiyat		
- * Club domestic league appearances and goals

Mahdi El Khammasi (Arabic:المهدي الخماسي) (born 8 May 1987) is a Qatari former footballer.
