= Neal Coonerty =

American businessman & politician

- Born: United States
- Occupations: Businessman, politician
- Known for: Third District Supervisor for the County of Santa Cruz,
- Political party: Democrat

Neal Coonerty was the Third District Supervisor for the County of Santa Cruz, California. He did two terms on the Board of Supervisors. He was elected in 1990 to the Santa Cruz City Council where his one term included a year as Mayor.

== Background ==
=== Personal ===
Coonerty was born in Santa Maria, California, but grew up in Van Nuys. In 1969, he graduated from the University of California, Berkeley, as an English literature major. He is married to Lucie who is a retired elementary school teacher. His children are politician Ryan Coonerty and Casey Coonerty Protti. Casey runs their family business, Bookshop Santa Cruz.

Coonerty has been named president of the American Booksellers Association twice. He is the co-owner of Bookshop Santa Cruz. It is now considered a local curio. The shop which once had a water bed in the middle of it was already a place of interest when he and his late wife, Candy, who was pregnant then, took it over in the early 1970s. It has survived the 1989 earthquake and a challenge and competition from other book stores such as Crown Books and Borders bookstore.

By the time he was 63 he had managed to drop his weight from 320 pounds to 185. He had Roux-en-Y gastric bypass surgery at the Clovis Community Medical Center in Fresno, California.

=== Political ===
From 1990 to 1994, Coonerty was a Santa Cruz city councilman. In 1993, he was the mayor of Santa Cruz. In March 2006, he announced he was running for the County Board of Supervisors seat. This was after Mardi Wormhoudt had publicly announced that she intended to retire. On 6 June 2006, facing two challengers, Chris Krohn and Jonathan Boutelle, Coonerty won the election with 58 percent of the vote. In 2010, facing Cove Britton and Doug Deitch, with more campaign cash and endorsements than either of Britton and Deitch he was picked as a favourite to win. He won and was elected to another term, taking 57 percent of the votes with Britton following behind with a respectable 34 percent. After two terms as supervisor, he decided not to stand for re-election in 2014. After 12 years in politics he decided it was time to change and do other things. In June 2014, his son Ryan ran for election to succeed his retiring father on the Santa Cruz County Board of Supervisors. He won with 76 percent of the vote.
