= Imam Hussein Mosque (Kuwait) =

Mosque in Kuwait City, Kuwait

- مسجد الإمام الحسين

- Location of the mosque in Kuwait

Religion
- Affiliation: Shia Islam
- Ecclesiastical or organizational status: Mosque
- Status: Active

Location
- Location: Kuwait City, Kuwait
- Interactive map of Imam Hussein Mosque
- Coordinates: 29°22′11″N 47°58′42″E

Architecture
- Completed: 1986

Specifications
- Capacity: 6,000
- Dome: 1
- Minaret: 4

Imam Hussein Mosque (Arabic: مسجد الإمام الحسين), in Midan Hawalli District, Kuwait City, is the largest Shi'a mosque in Kuwait. Its prayer hall accommodates about 4,000 to 5,000 men and 500 to 1,000 women. The mosque was built in 1986. It was unharmed in the 1990 invasion of Kuwait.

== See also ==
- List of mosques in Kuwait
- Islam in Kuwait
