= Riqqa, Kuwait =

Area in Ahmadi Governorate in Kuwait

Riqqa ٱلرِّقَة
- Area
- Location within Kuwait Location within Asia
- Coordinates: 29°08′56″N 48°06′20.5″E

Population (2007)
  - Total: 56,554

Riqqa (Arabic: الرقة) is an area in Ahmadi Governorate in southern Kuwait. In 2007 it had a population of 56,554. It was founded on the 1970s as a government housing development project for Kuwaiti families. The area consists of 7 blocks, 6 residential and 1 commercial.

== History ==
Riqqa was named after the Battle of Riqqa (1783) between the Kuwait and Banu Ka'b. The sea battle in which ended with the victory of the Emirate of Kuwait. Riqqa was built in the early 1970s as government housing development was finished on April 1972. The project consisted of 2230 two-storyed housing units costing over 9 million Kuwaiti dinars. The distribution of housing units started on December 1974 following the delayed completion of public services. On 1977, The Riqqa Cooperative Society was founded on October 3rd with the goal of managing commercial-designated areas.
