= Mardi Oakley Medawar =

American novelist

- Born: 1945 (age 80–81); Olla, Louisiana, U.S.
- Occupation: Novelist
- Writing career
- Genre: Mystery fiction

Mardi Oakley Medawar (born 1945) is an American novelist. Her novels mostly centre on the Kiowa and Crow tribes, and are usually within the mystery genre.

== Personal life ==
Medawar was born in Olla, Louisiana in 1945, the daughter of an Eastern Band Cherokee father and a French Louisianan mother. She attended San Diego State University and taught writing at several colleges.

As of 2012, she lives on the Red Cliff Chippewa Reservation. She has described herself as an "Intertribalist".

== Novels ==
- The Ft. Larned Incident (2000). ISBN 0-312-20878-2
- Murder at Medicine Lodge (1999). ISBN 0-312-19925-2
- Remembering the Osage Kid (1999). ISBN 0-553-57675-5
- The Misty Hills Of Home (1998). ISBN 0-451-19086-6
- Witch of the Palo Duro (1997). ISBN 0-312-17065-3
- Death at Rainy Mountain, (1996). ISBN 0-312-14310-9
- People of the Whistling Waters (1993). ISBN 1-879915-05-7

== Awards ==
- People of the Whistling Waters, Medicine Pipe Bearer's Award for Best First Novel (Spur Awards sponsored by Western Writers of America, 1993).
- Prose Fiction Writer of the Year Award (Wordcraft Circle of Native Writers, 1998)

== See also ==
- Native American studies
