= Medawar zone =

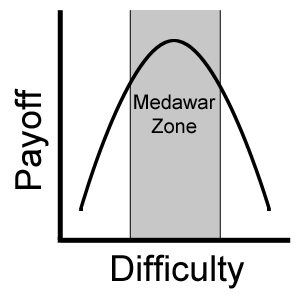

The Medawar Zone is the area of problems which are most likely to produce fruitful results. Problems that are too simple are unlikely to produce novel or significant results. Problems that are too ambitious may not succeed at all or may be rejected by the research community at large.

In an article on research creativity in research, Craig Loehle named this zone after Sir Peter Medawar, a Nobel Prize-winning medical researcher who was active from the 1940s to the 1960s. In The Art of the Soluble, Medawar suggested that there seems to be a certain time when scientific questions seem especially ripe for answering, whereas other questions remain elusive and out-of-reach from investigation.
