= Islam in Kuwait =

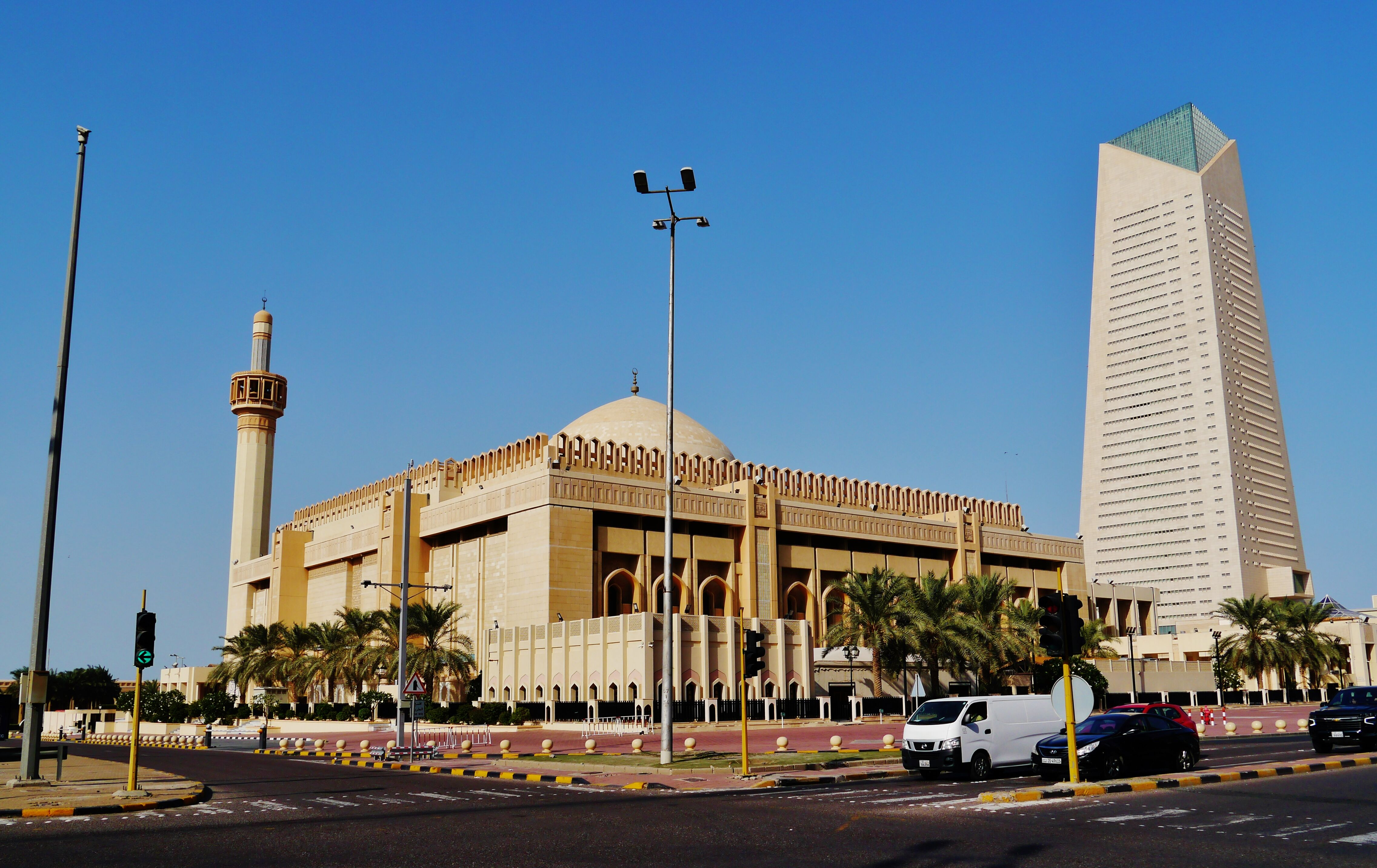
Grand Mosque of Kuwait

Islam is the main religion of Kuwait, with the majority of Kuwaiti citizens being Muslim. More recent estimates from nongovernmental organizations (NGOs) and the media suggest that about 70% of Kuwaiti citizens are Sunni Muslims, and around 30% are Shia Muslims. Estimates from the early 2000s similarly reported a Sunni majoirty and a Shia minority within Kuwait's Muslim population. In 2001, there were an estimated 525,000 Sunni Kuwaiti citizens and 300,000 Shia Kuwaiti citizens. In 2002, the US Department of State reported that Shias formed 30%-40% of Kuwait's citizen population, noting there were 525,000 Sunni Kuwaiti citizens and 855,000 Kuwaiti citizens in total (61% Sunnis, 39% Shias). In 2004, there were an estimated 600,000 Sunni Kuwaiti citizens, 300,000-350,000 Shia Kuwaiti citizens and 913,000 Kuwaiti citizens in total.

Among expatriates, roughly 62.7% are Muslim with approximately 5% being Shia Muslim. Some other minor Muslim sects do exist in Kuwait's society, but in very small or rare numbers.

== History of Islam in Kuwait ==
Islam has been the dominant religion in Kuwait since the spread of Islam across the Arabian Peninsula in the 7th century. The region that later became Kuwait was influenced by Islamic tradition through tribal networks and trade routes connecting the Persian Gulf to the wider Islamic world. During the rule of the Ottoman Empire in the Gulf, Islamic institutions and legal practices continued to shape local governance and social organization.

With the establishment of the modern Kuwait state under the Al Sabah family in the 18th and 19th centuries, Islam remained central to political legitimacy and social identity. Following independence in 1961 and the adoption of the 1962 constitution, Islam was formally institutionalized as the state religion, reinforcing its role in the country's legal and political structure.

== Islam and the State ==
Islam plays a major role in Kuwait's governance and legal systems. Article 2 of the Constitution of Kuwait states, "The religion of the State is Islam and Islamic Law shall be a main source of legislation."

Kuwait's legal system combines elements of civil law and Islamic Law. Sharia primarily governs personal status issues, such as marriage, divorce, and inheritance for Muslim citizens, while other areas of law are influenced by civil legal traditions.

The constitution also provides freedom of belief and religious practice. However, such freedoms are subject to limitations related to public order and morality. Minority religious groups, including Christians and Atheists, report keeping their beliefs private to avoid attention and potential consequences.

== Political Role of Islam ==
Islam influences politics in Kuwait through formal institutions and informal social dynamics. Kuwait does not officially recognize political parties, but several political groupings are based on Islamic ideologies and participate in parliamentary life. Sunni Islamist movements, like the Islamic Constitutional Movement, as well as Shia political organizations, like the National Islamic Alliance, have historically played roles in the National Assembly of Kuwait.

Despite Sunni Muslims constituting most of Kuwait's population and Shia Muslims representing a minority, Shia's have maintained a presence in parliamentary politics. Sectarian identity has, at times, influenced political alignments, particularly through participation of Sunni Islamist groupings and Shia political organizations in elections and legislative activity. However, Kuwait has been described as maintaining a relatively inclusive political environment for both communities compared to some other states in the region. The National Assembly consists of 50 elected members, with Shia candidates historically securing a minority of seats, typically ranging from 6 to 10 representatives.

The government also exercises oversight over religious institutions, including the appointment of Sunni imams and regulation of sermons.

== Islam's Influence On Society and Culture ==
Islam is a central component of daily life and cultural practices in Kuwait. Religious observances, such as Ramadan, daily prayers, and mosque attendance, are widely practiced, and Islamic values influence social norms and behavior.

The Kuwaiti government supports religious life through institutions like the Ministry of Awqaf and Islamic Affairs (MAIA), which oversees mosques and religious education. As of 2024, there was over 1,800 mosques in Kuwait that are all overseen by MAIA. Non-Muslim communities are permitted to practice their religions, provided they do not conflict with public order or established customs.

== Islam and Foreign Relations ==
As a founding member of the Gulf Cooperation Council (GCC) and as a part of the broader Arab and Islamic world, Kuwait maintains relationships with both Sunni-majority and Shia-majority states, including Saudi Arabia and Iran.

Analysts note that Kuwait has historically maintained relatively inclusive relations with its Shia population compared to some neighboring states, which has shaped both domestic governance and external positioning. This approach reflects the country's internal demographic composition, including both Sunni and Shia Muslim populations with about 70% being Sunni and the remaining 30% being Shia.

Religion also contributes to Kuwait's participation in international organizations, like the Organisation of Islamic Cooperation, where shared Islamic identity forms part of diplomatic engagement and cooperation among member states.

== See also ==
- Religion in Kuwait
- Demographics of Kuwait
