= Killing of Jeremy Mardis =

2015 child homicide

- Undated photo of victim Jeremy Mardis
- Location: 31°07′30.4″N 92°02′59.7″W; Marksville, Louisiana, in Avoyelles Parish, U.S.
- Date: November 3, 2015 ≈ 9:30 p.m.
- Attack type: Police shooting; child homicide; manslaughter; attempted manslaughter
- Deaths: 1 (Jeremy David Mardis)
- Injuries: 1 (Christopher Few)
- Perpetrators: Derrick Stafford and Norris Greenhouse Jr.
- Charges: Stafford: Second-degree murder; Manslaughter (lesser-included offense); Attempted second-degree murder; Attempted manslaughter (lesser-included offense); Greenhouse: Negligent homicide; Malfeasance in office
- Burial: Beaumont Cemetery, Beaumont, Mississippi
- Sentence: Stafford: 40 years imprisonment (parole possible after 20 years); Greenhouse: 7 years imprisonment (paroled after 1 3/4 years)
- Verdict: Stafford: Guilty on the lesser-included offenses of manslaughter and attempted manslaughter Greenhouse: Pleaded guilty

On November 3, 2015, Jeremy Mardis, a six-year-old boy, was killed by police in Marksville, Louisiana, in a shooting that also wounded his father, Chris Few.

Two Marksville law enforcement officers, Derrick Stafford and Norris Greenhouse Jr., were arrested on charges of second-degree murder and attempted second-degree murder as a result of the incident. The evidence from a police body-worn video camera was cited as being contributory to the speed of the arrests.

On March 24, 2017, Stafford was found guilty on the lesser-included offenses of manslaughter and attempted manslaughter. He was sentenced to 40 years in prison, with the possibility of parole after 20 years.

On September 29, 2017, Greenhouse pleaded guilty to negligent homicide and malfeasance in office. He was sentenced to 7 years in prison, but was paroled in 2019 after serving 1 3/4 years, a quarter of his initial sentence.

== Background ==
Marksville is a small city with a population of 5,702 at the 2010 census, characterized by familiar relationships and interactions between locals. The city had a series of running conflicts between Mayor John Lemoine and several city officials over budgets. The conflicts reportedly started soon after Lemoine took office in 2009, when he called for several audits of the city court and recommended that the city council lower the budget, including the salary of Marksville Marshal (equivalent to a police chief in other jurisdictions) Floyd Voinche. Citizens have described the politics as "particularly intense and personal". Lemoine was also reportedly in conflict with the Marksville Police Department, which had three different chiefs during Lemoine's five years in office.

About three months prior to the shooting incident, Voinche's office hired several local police officers to work part-time in street patrols and purchased two used Ford Crown Victoria police vehicles for their use. The street patrols involved mostly making traffic stops and issuing citations. Before that, the local marshal office's jurisdiction had been limited to serving court papers. According to Lemoine, speaking after the shooting occurred, Voinche did not consult with the city about this expansion of his operations, including the hiring of full-time police officers. Lemoine had written at least one letter to the office of Louisiana Attorney General Buddy Caldwell, questioning the legal authority of Voinche's actions. Because state statute gives marshals the authority to enforce the law within their respective jurisdictions, street patrols and issuing tickets were considered to be encompassed in this authority.

== Shooting incident ==
Location of Mardis's shooting

On the night of November 3, 2015, officers Derrick Stafford and Norris Greenhouse of the Marksville Marshal's Office attempted to stop a vehicle driven by Christopher Few. His son, Jeremy Mardis, was a passenger in the front seat. After Few and his fiancée Megan Dixon had an argument at a bar that evening, they had driven away in separate vehicles. Dixon said that she saw Few pass her, followed by a marked police car with two officers.

Greenhouse and Stafford activated the patrol car lights, but Few failed to pull over, resulting in a two-mile car chase. At some point, Greenhouse and Stafford called for backup, and two other officers responded. The chase ended on a dead-end street, near the entrance to the Marksville State Historic Site, at the corner of Martin Luther King Drive and Taensas Street. One of the responding officers used his body camera to record the confrontation.

Greenhouse and Stafford fired 18 rounds of ammunition into Few's vehicle around 9:30 pm. Few was struck twice, in the head and chest, despite having his hands in the air, which was recorded on police body-camera footage. Mardis was hit by five bullets, and was also struck in the head and chest, killing him instantly.

== Police officers involved ==
Three of the four involved officers worked both as police officers and as marshals. While in most of Louisiana marshals are authorized only to serve legal documents such as arrest warrants, in Marksville, deputy marshals were empowered earlier in 2015 to make discretionary arrests, "preserve the peace", and issue traffic tickets.

=== Officers who fired the shots ===
Norris Greenhouse Jr., 23, and Derrick Stafford, 32, were officers with the Marksville Police Department. Greenhouse was a reserve officer with Marksville and served as a deputy marshal for the nearby Alexandria City Marshal's Office; he had been on the force for one year.

Stafford was a lieutenant and shift supervisor for the Marksville Police Department, and an eight-year veteran of that department. He was "moonlighting" as a deputy marshal at the time of the shooting. That night, Greenhouse and Stafford were working side jobs for the city marshal's office. They were two of several officers hired by the Marksville Marshal's Office about three months prior to the shooting.

At the time of the shooting, Greenhouse, Stafford, and Marksville Police Chief Elster Smith, Jr., were the subjects of a federal civil suit for use of force. Stafford was the subject of five civil suits in Avoyelles Parish; Greenhouse was named in one of these. In addition, Stafford had been indicted in 2011 by Rapides Parish on two counts of aggravated rape, but the charges were dropped in 2012.

=== Responding officers ===
Lieutenant Jason Brouillette, a 13-year veteran of the Marksville Police Department, and Sergeant Kenneth Parnell, a five-year veteran, responded to the backup call made by Greenhouse and Stafford. Parnell was wearing a body camera, which recorded at least part of the incident.

Brouillette and Parnell were placed on administrative leave following the incident. Investigators do not believe either of them fired his weapon.

== Victims ==
=== Christopher Few ===
Christopher Few moved from Mississippi to the Marksville area in April 2014 to work as an apprentice riverboat captain and to be closer to his relatives. He was listed in critical condition on November 3. A family spokesperson said that bullet fragments remained in Few's brain and lung. His condition improved to serious by the following morning. As of November 9, Few was hospitalized in Alexandria, Louisiana, where his condition had been upgraded to fair. He was released from the hospital on November 13. Few and Mardis shared a home with Few's mother prior to the shooting. Body-cam footage reportedly shows Few had his hands up when he was shot.

=== Jeremy Mardis ===
Jeremy David Mardis (August 11, 2009 – November 3, 2015) was diagnosed with autism at the age of two. At the time of the shooting, he was in the first grade and attended Lafargue Elementary School in Effie, Louisiana. He had moved with his father to Louisiana from Mississippi the year before. Mardis' mother Katie Mardis, and his sister, still live in Mississippi. Christopher Few's fiancée Dixon described Mardis as an affectionate and intelligent child, and said that Mardis did speak. Mardis and Few shared a home with Few's mother prior to the shooting. Mardis was in the front seat of Few's vehicle and wearing a seatbelt when they were shot. He was pronounced dead at the scene.

A funeral for Mardis was held on November 9 at Moore Funeral Services in Hattiesburg, Mississippi, where his mother and sister live. He was buried in Beaumont Cemetery. His father was still hospitalized and unable to attend.

== Investigation and prosecution ==
Charles Riddle, the district attorney for Avoyelles Parish, recused himself from the case because Officer Greenhouse's father is an assistant district attorney in his office. The office of the attorney general of Louisiana prosecuted the cases of Greenhouse and Stafford.

Greenhouse and Stafford surrendered to police on the evening of November 6, and they were charged with second-degree murder and second-degree attempted murder. They were transferred on November 9 from a jail in Avoyelles Parish to Rapides Parish Detention Center #3 because, as the police said, the latter facility is "better equipped to isolate [Greenhouse and Stafford] from the general population". Separating ex-law-enforcement inmates from regular inmates when they are incarcerated is standard procedure.

=== Investigation ===
Colonel Mike Edmonson of the Louisiana State Police began an investigation into the shooting. He said that the body-camera video recorded by one of the responding officers was essential to the officers being arrested. Other contributory evidence included interviews with the cooperating officers, 9-1-1 recordings, and unspecified forensic evidence. Legal analysts cited by The Advocate newspaper of Baton Rouge, Louisiana, also attributed the arrests to the body-camera footage.

Ballistics tests showed that of the four responding officers, only Greenhouse and Stafford fired their weapons.

Although initial news reports said Few had a warrant for his arrest prior to or after the shooting, the state police have said this was not true. In addition, Edmonson said that there was no evidence of a firearm inside Few's vehicle.

The Civil Rights Division of the U.S. Department of Justice, as well as the Federal Bureau of Investigation (FBI) and the Office of the United States Attorney, are participating in the investigation.

Few's fiancée Megan Dixon said that the police pursuit of Few may have been prompted by his running a red light or by the officers seeing an altercation she had with Few at a traffic light, when he approached her car and they had words. One police vehicle reportedly received damage caused by Few reversing into it.

Dixon also said that Few had encountered Greenhouse a month before the shooting. He threatened to hurt Greenhouse after the officer contacted Dixon, a former high-school classmate, and went to the home she shared with Few. She said Few told Greenhouse, "Don't come to my home again, or I'll hurt you".

=== Gag order ===
Judge William Bennett of the Louisiana 12th Judicial District Court was assigned to the case and presided over the bail hearing on November 9. He issued a gag order that day, forbidding all parties, including police, victims, and witnesses, from discussing the case with the press. Media outlets had requested the Louisiana State Police to release public records with information about the case, but these requests were denied as a result of the judge's order.

=== Bail hearing and bond posting ===
A description of the body-cam video's contents was presented as evidence during the bail hearings, but the video was not shown. Bail was set at US$1 million for each officer. On November 24, Greenhouse's family posted bond and he was released. Stafford posted bail and was released in March; both men were under house arrest.

=== Trial dates ===
Stafford's trial began on March 13, 2017; Greenhouse's trial date was set for June 12, 2017. The judge had postponed these dates to allow the defense time to prepare, including for their use of expert witnesses.

=== Outcome ===
The jury found Stafford guilty of manslaughter and attempted manslaughter. Stafford was sentenced to 40 years in prison, half of which would be served "without benefit of parole, probation, or suspension of sentence."

On September 29, 2017, Greenhouse pleaded guilty to negligent homicide and malfeasance in office. He was sentenced to five years for the negligent-homicide charge and two years for the malfeasance in office. Sources stated that Few's family agreed to the terms of the plea deal. The attorney general's prosecutor cited differences in the actions of the two officers as the reason for the extreme differences in their sentences. Norris Greenhouse, Jr., was released from prison as of July 3, 2019, after serving only 21 months (25%) of a seven-year sentence.
