= History of Penkridge =

Coordinates: 52.723°N 2.113°W

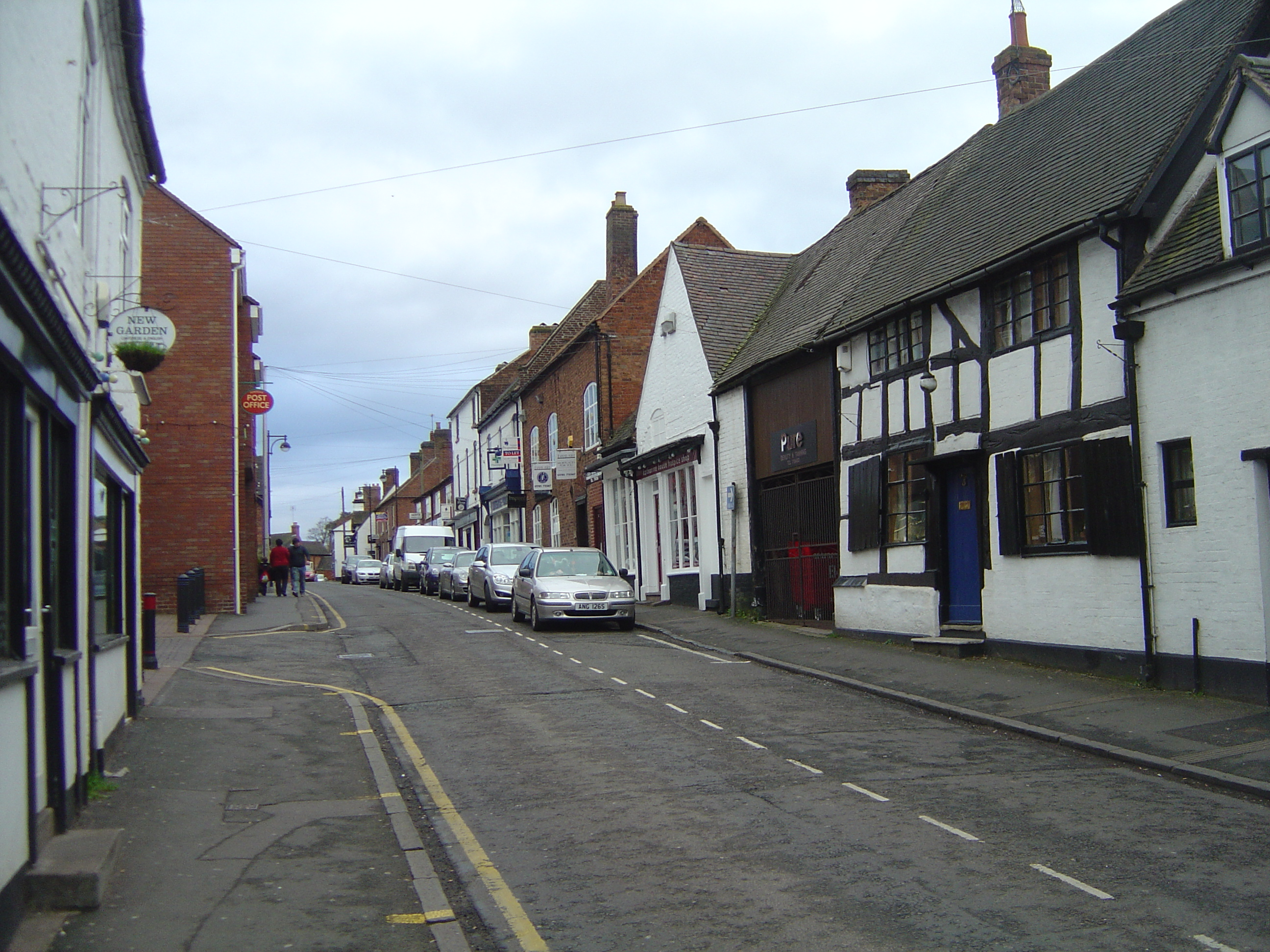
Market Street, Penkridge. This was the main axis along which the village developed, between the church and the market place. It exhibits buildings from many historical periods.

Penkridge is a village and parish in Staffordshire with a history stretching back to the Anglo-Saxon period. A religious as well as a commercial centre, it was originally centred on the Collegiate Church of St. Michael and All Angels, a chapel royal and royal peculiar that maintained its independence until the Reformation. Mentioned in Domesday, Penkridge underwent a period of growth from the 13th century, as the Forest Law was loosened, and evolved into a patchwork of manors of greatly varying size and importance, heavily dependent on agriculture. From the 16th century it was increasingly dominated by a single landed gentry family, the Littletons, who ultimately attained the Peerage of the United Kingdom as the Barons Hatherton, and who helped modernise its agriculture and education system. The Industrial Revolution inaugurated a steady improvement in transport and communications that helped shape the modern village. In the second half of the 20th century, Penkridge grew rapidly, evolving into a mainly residential area, while retaining its commercial centre, its links with the countryside and its fine church.

== Early settlement ==
Early human occupation of the immediate area around Penkridge has been confirmed by the presence of a Bronze or Iron Age barrow at nearby Rowley Hill. A significant settlement in this vicinity has existed since pre-Roman times, with its original location being at the intersection of the River Penk and what became the Roman military road known as Watling Street (today's A5 trunk road). This would place it between Water Eaton and Gailey, about 2.25 miles (3.62 km) SSW of the modern town.

== Anglo-Saxon origins ==
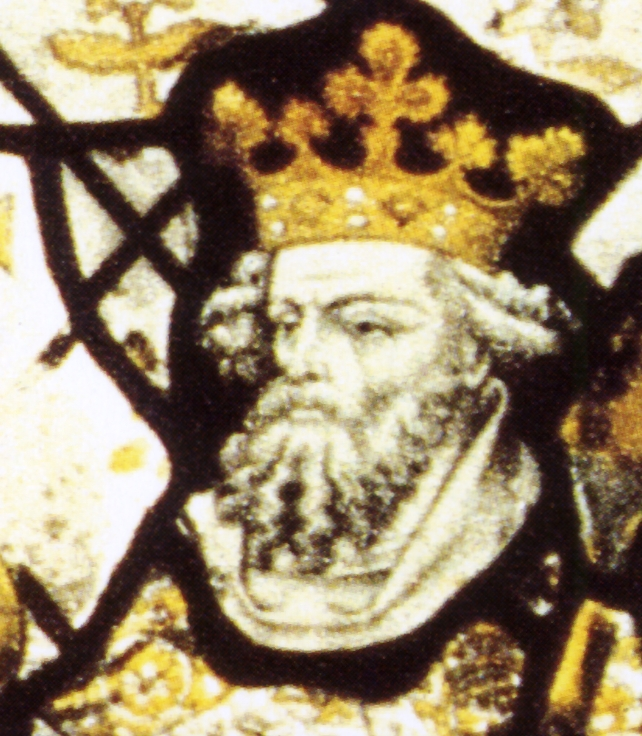
King Edgar the Peaceful (959-975), who described Penkridge as a "famous place" in an important charter issued there. Detail of stained glass window, All Souls College Chapel, Oxford.

The village of Penkridge in its current location dates back at least to the early Middle Ages, when the area was part of Mercia, and it held an important place in local society, trade, and religious observance.

The first clear reference to the settlement of Pencric comes from the reign of Edgar the Peaceful (959-975), who issued a royal charter from it in 958, describing it as a "famous place". Around 1000, Wulfgeat, a Shropshire landowner, left bullocks to the church at Penkridge, which means that the church must date from at least the 10th century. In the 16th century, John Alen, dean of Penkridge and Archbishop of Dublin, claimed that the founder of the collegiate church of St. Michael at Penkridge was King Eadred (946-55), Edgar's uncle, which seems plausible. The origins of the settlement may go back much earlier in the Anglo-Saxon period, but the known dates suggest that it achieved considerable importance in the mid-10th century and that the village's significance was in large part dependent on its important church.

A local legend claims that King Edgar made Penkridge his capital for three years whilst he was reconquering the Danelaw. However most historical sources see the reign of Edgar as an uneventful one, as his cognomen suggests, and there is no record of any internal strife between English and Danes during his reign, making this claim doubtful. At Domesday, more than a century later, Penkridge was still a royal manor, and St. Michael's was a chapel royal. This makes it likely that Edgar stayed here simply because it was one of his homes: medieval rulers were itinerant, moving with their retinue to consume their resources in situ, rather than having them transported to a capital.

In about 1086, Domesday not only recorded the then situation at Penkridge, but gave considerable insight into changes and continuities since the Anglo-Saxon period. Penkridge was still held by the king, William the Conqueror, directly, not simply as overlord of another magnate - just as Edward the Confessor held it before the Norman Conquest. The king had a mill and a substantial area of woodland. The numbers working on the king's land are, however, very small: just two slaves, two villeins and two smallholders, although the land at Penkridge was worth 40 shillings annually. Then there were the subsidiary parts of the manor: Wolgarston, Drayton, Congreve, Dunston, Cowley and Beffcote, which had almost 30 workers and had increased in value from 65s. to 100s. since the Conquest – unusual in the Midlands or North at that time.

At Penkridge itself a substantial part of the agricultural land was held from the king by nine clerics, who had a hide of land, worked by six slaves and seven villeins. These clerics had a further 2¾ hides at Gnosall, to the north, with twelve workers. Both these holdings had risen greatly in value since the Conquest. In Henry I's time, there was a dispute between the Abbey of Saint-Remi or Saint-Rémy at Reims in Northern France, which claimed the church at Lapley, next to its daughter house, Lapley Priory, and a royal chaplain. It is believed the clerk in question was a canon of Penkridge, trying to vindicate an ancient claim to Lapley. A 13th-century source confirms that Lapley once belonged to Penkridge. The court found in favour of Saint-Rémy and Lapley was confirmed as a small independent parish in the advowson of Saint-Rémy. However, this was not a result of the Norman Conquest directly, but was intended as confirmation of a grant to the French abbey by Ælfgar, Earl of Mercia, in the closing years of the Anglo-Saxon monarchy.

Penkridge seems to have passed through the Conquest not only unscathed but enhanced in wealth and status: a royal manor, with a sizeable royal demesne and a substantial church, staffed by a community of clerics. However, it was clearly not, in the modern sense, a village. Penkridge itself would have been a small village on the southern bank of the River Penk, with the homes of the laity grouped to the east of the church, along the Stafford-Worcester road, and with a scattering of hamlets in the surrounding area.

== Medieval Penkridge ==
=== St. Michael's Collegiate Church ===
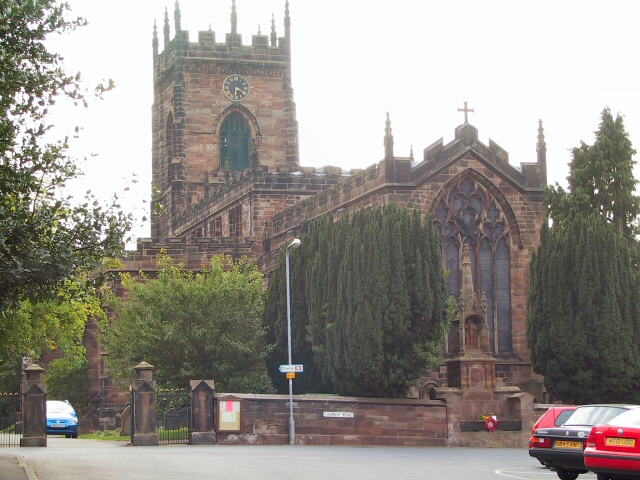
General view of the church from the east. It has dominated the town since its foundation in the late Anglo-Saxon period, although the present appearance of the building is mainly the result of 16th century rebuilding.

The church was the most notable feature of Penkridge from late Anglo-Saxon times. By the 13th century, it had reached a distinctive form.

- It was a chapel royal - a place set aside by the monarchs for their own use. This made it independent of the local Bishop of Lichfield - an institution called a Royal Peculiar.
- It was a collegiate church, staffed by a college of priests, who formed its chapter.
- It was organised like a cathedral chapter.
- It was headed by the Archbishop of Dublin.

The college was already a well-established institution by the Norman Conquest. The nine clerics mentioned in Domesday were far too many for a small village and served a wide area of Staffordshire from their base in Penkridge. The priests who belonged the college were often called canons, the usual term for permanent staff attached to a cathedral or large church. As a body, they were also known as a chapter. The chapter survived the Norman Conquest in much the same form as in Anglo-Saxon times. Throughout its existence, it was made up of secular clergy, not monks.

In all this, St. Michael's, Penridge, was similar to its nearby namesake, St. Michael's Collegiate Church at Tettenhall, to St. Peter's Collegiate Church, Wolverhampton, and to St Mary's College at Stafford. All were chapels royal, similarly organised and zealously guarding their independence. They formed an indigestible block within the borders of the diocese of Lichfield, whose bishop was the ordinary - the officer responsible for carrying out the laws of the Church and maintaining proper order in the region. Sometimes it seems that they acted in concert, forming a united front against determined bishops. This was in stark contrast to the relative malleability of the small, local parish churches.

The church and college lost their independence only during the Anarchy of King Stephen's reign. Keen to consolidate the support of the church for his coup against Empress Matilda, Stephen gave the churches of Penkridge and Stafford to Roger de Clinton, bishop of Coventry and Lichfield. At some time after the first Plantagenet ruler, Henry II, took over in 1154, Penkridge escaped episcopal control. Certainly by 1180 it was again the possession of the king. In the meantime, it had been reorganised to a template derived from the chapter of Lichfield Cathedral, which was established on the same lines in the mid-12th century. Like a cathedral, the college was now headed by a dean. The first dean was called Robert but little else is known of him. The canons were now prebendaries, meaning that each was supported by revenue from a fixed group of estates and rights that constituted his prebend, and which was technically attached to his choir stall, not to him personally. There were prebends of Coppenhall, Stretton, Shareshill, Dunston, Penkridge, Congreve, and Longridge. It is possible that the prebend of Penkridge absorbed the lands held by the nine priests of the Domesday survey. In addition, two prebends were later created for the two chantries. For many decades Cannock was also a prebend of Penkridge, although it was strongly disputed by the chapter of Lichfield, and seems to have slipped out of Penkridge's grasp permanently in the mid-14th century.

In 1215, the year of Magna Carta, King John conferred the advowson of the deanery - or right to appoint a dean - on Henry de Loundres, or Henry of London, a devoted servant of the Crown who had once been Archdeacon of Stafford, and had recently been consecrated Archbishop of Dublin. John was under enormous pressure from the barons, so he was keen to consolidate his supporters. The Hose or Hussey family had been granted the manor of Penkridge some time previously, but in 1215 Hugh Hose, the putative successor to the manor, was a ward of King John. John induced him to convey the manor to the archbishop, along with Congreve, Wolgarston, Cowley, Beffcote, and Little Onn (in Church Eaton), all of which were considered "members" or constituent parts of Penkridge manor.

The archbishop used the opportunity to enrich both his family and his diocese. He divided the manor permanently into two unequal parts. Two-thirds he gave to his nephew, Andrew de Blund. The remaining third Henry gave to the church: it became known as the deanery manor. The de Blund family, later rendered as Blount, held the manor of Penkridge for about 140 years, finally selling it to other lay lords. Along with the prebends and various other holdings, the Deanery Manor was to finance the college of St. Michael for more than 300 years. When the newly enriched deanery fell vacant in 1226, Henry seized the opportunity to appoint himself to the post. Although John's son, Henry III challenged this by appointing a dean of his own, the relevant charter was recovered and the principle established that the deanery of Penkridge was to be held by the archbishops of Dublin, as it was from this point until the Reformation. This was an arrangement unique to Penkridge.

The Church of St. Michael and All Angels

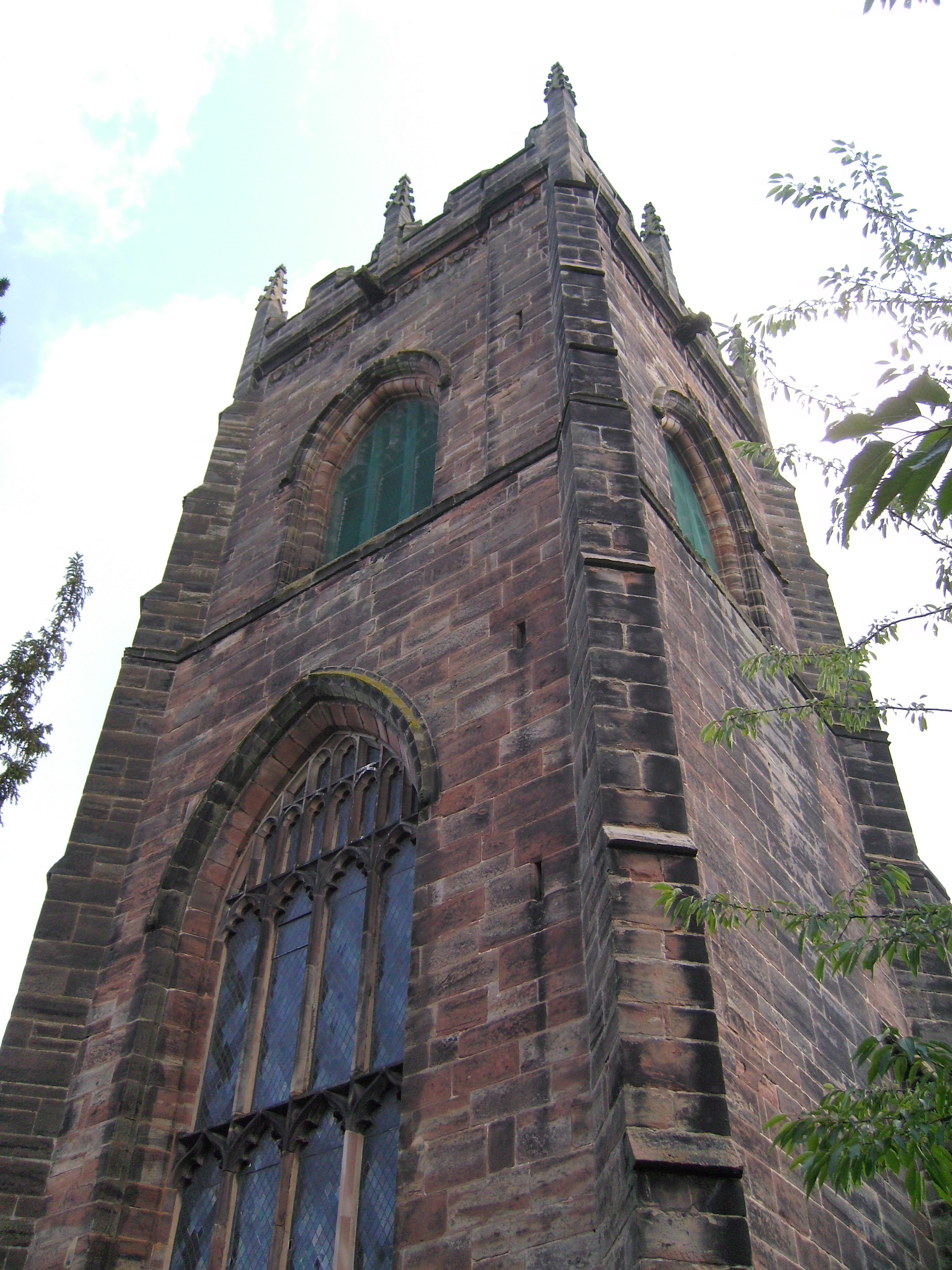
Exterior view of the western end of the church, showing large Perpendicular window.

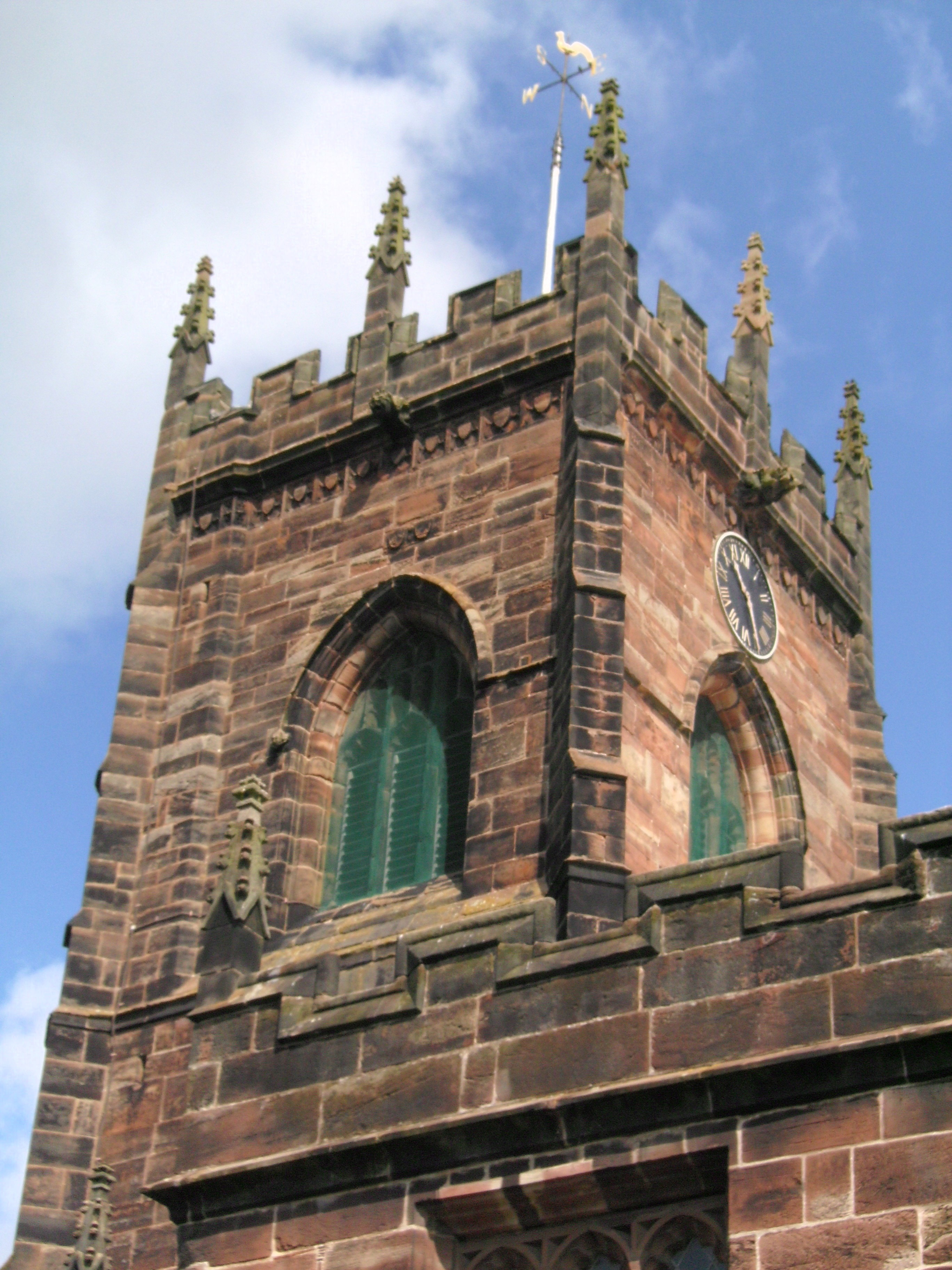
View of the tower, modified in late Perpendicular style in the 16th century.

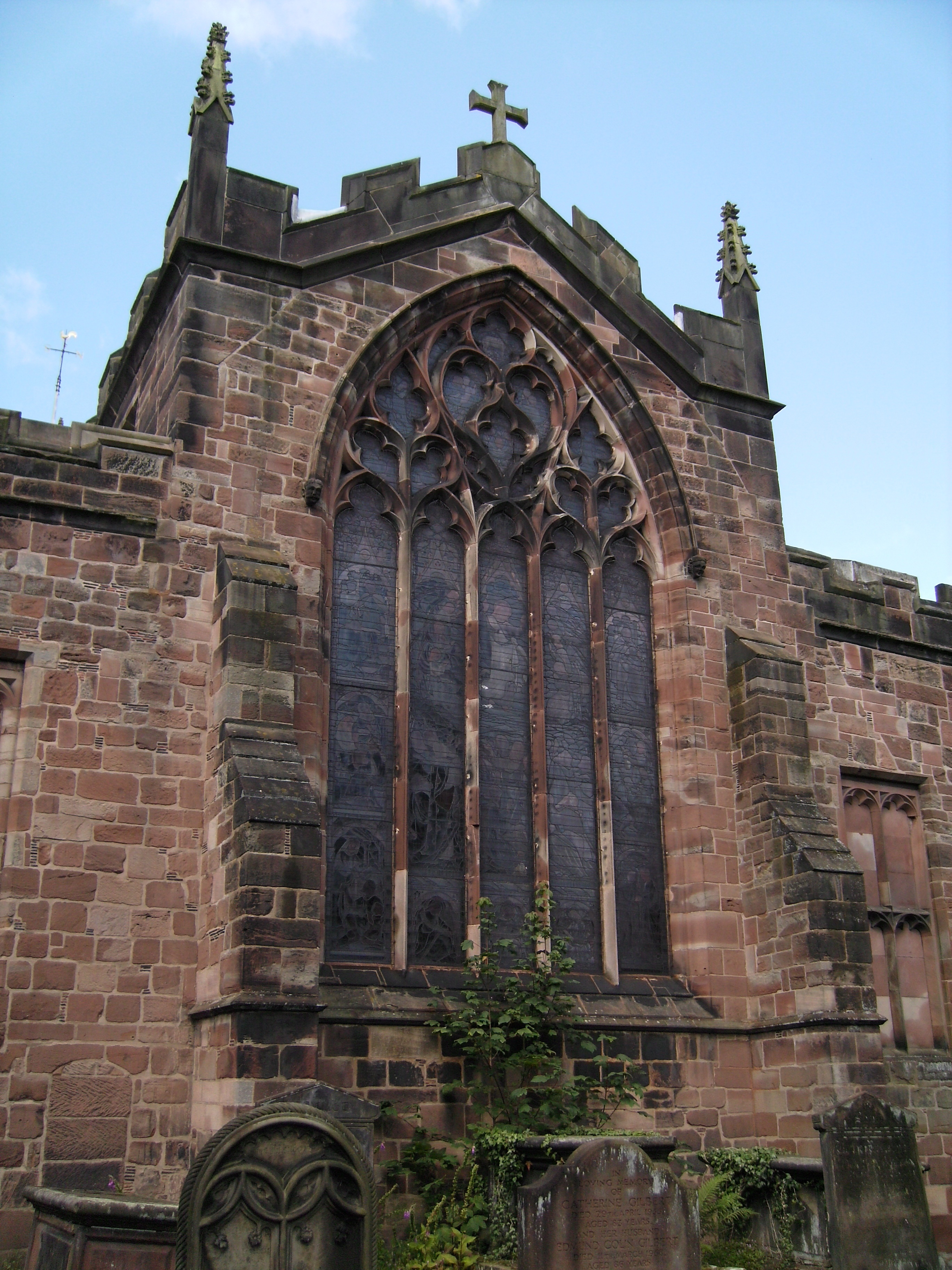
East window. Perpendicular in style, it formerly contained much more tracery.

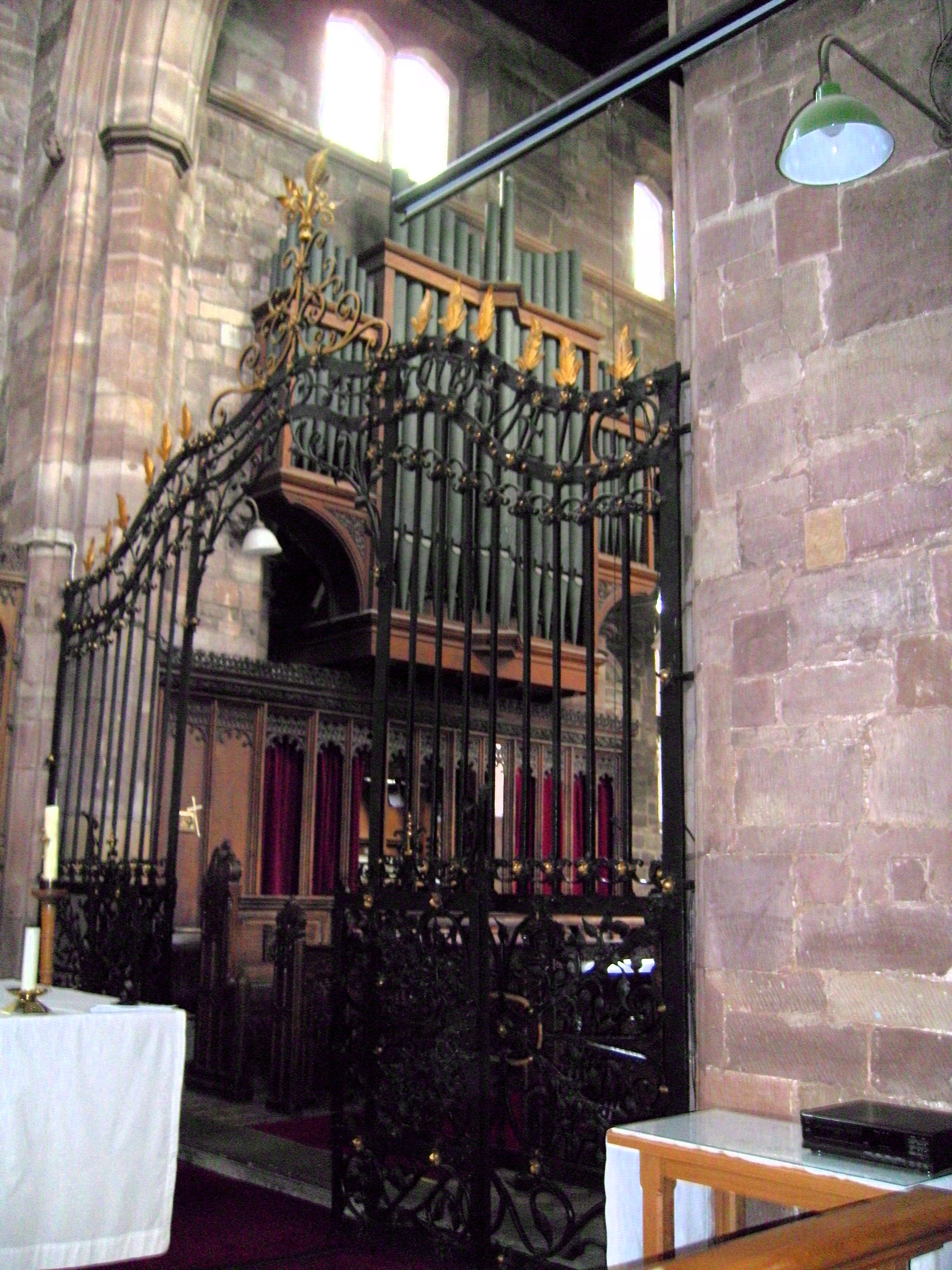
The wrought iron chancel gates of Dutch origin, dated 1778. The organ, formerly in the tower arch, was moved to present position in 1881.

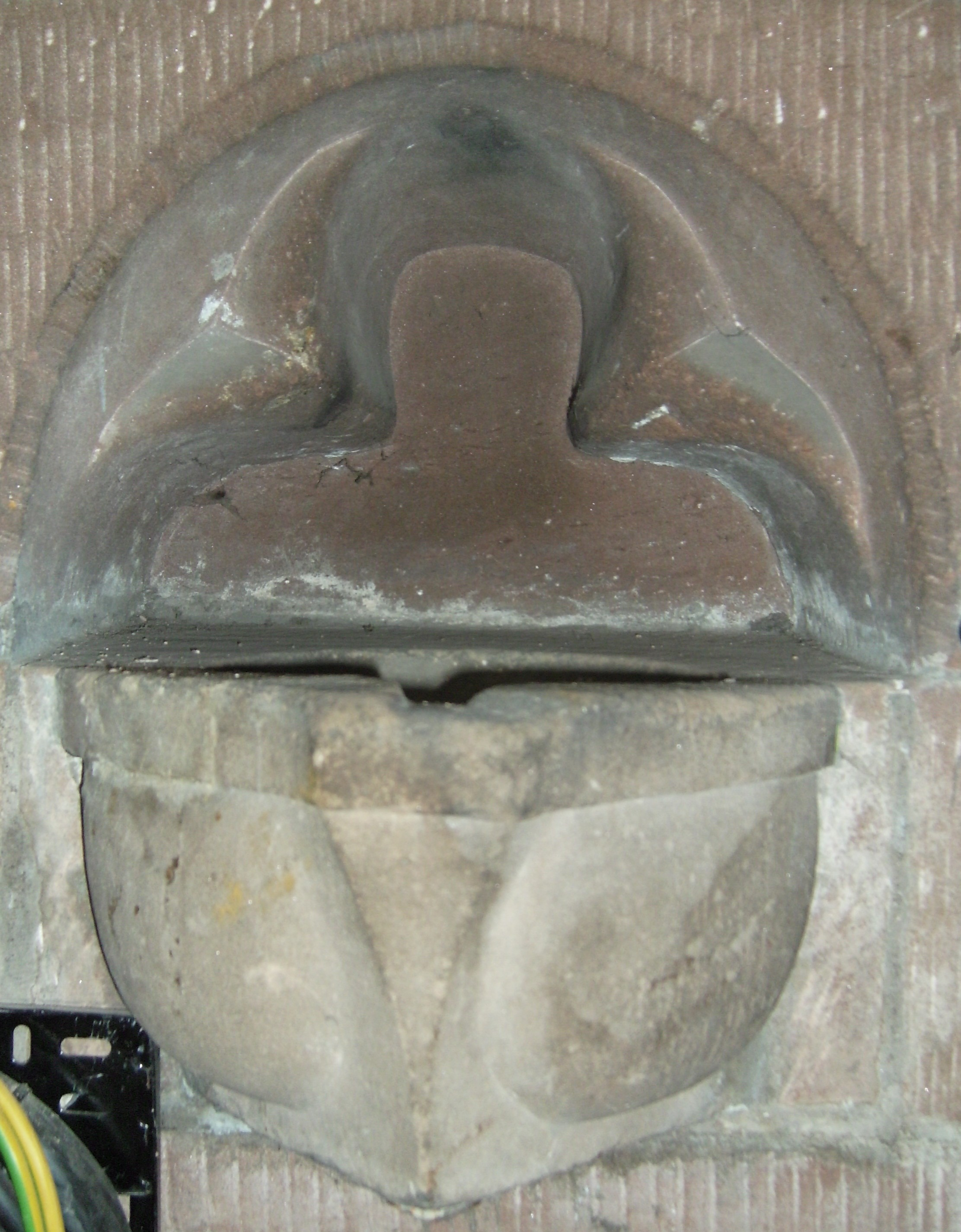
Lavabo in wall of south chancel aisle

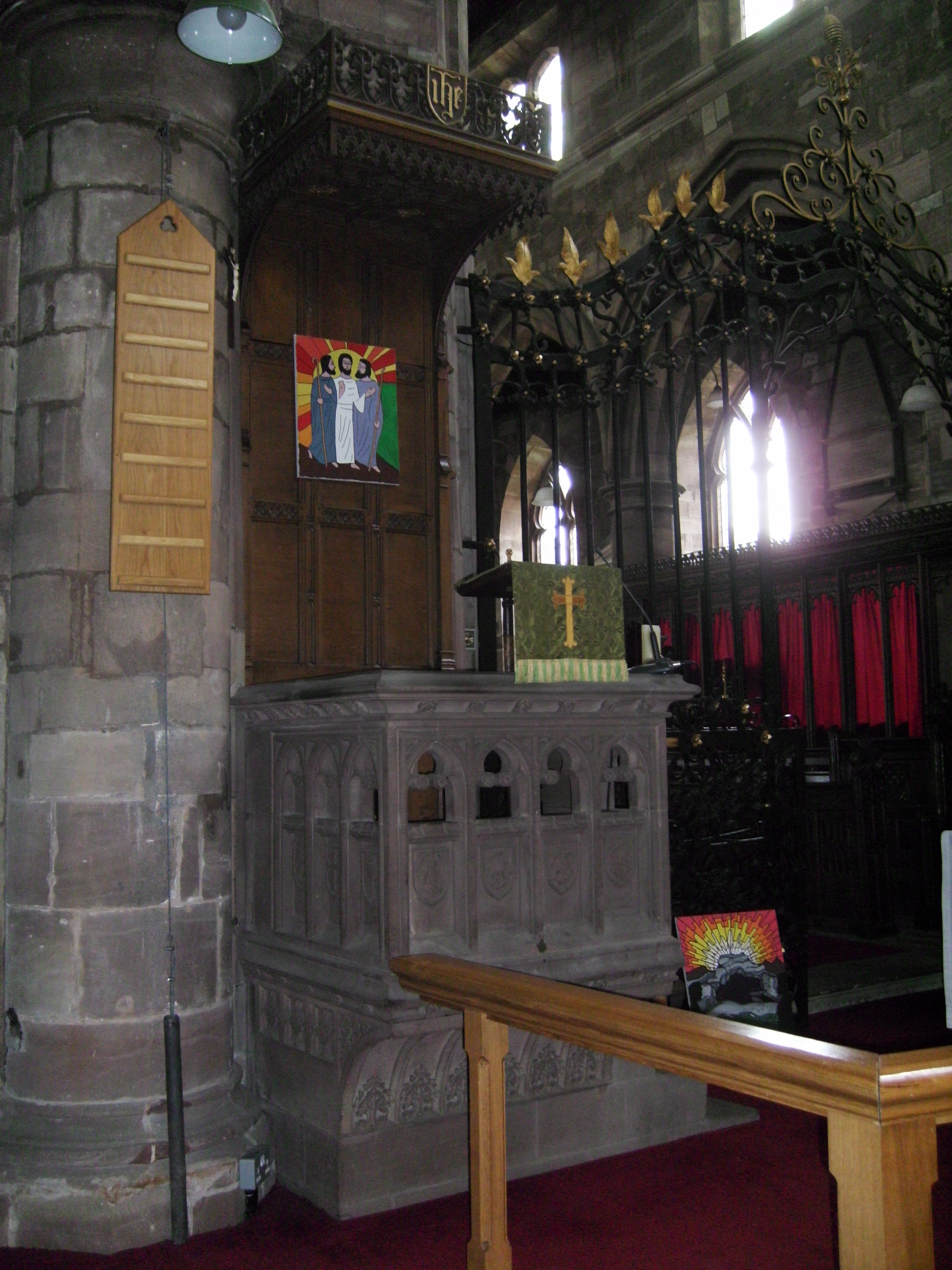
Stone pulpit, 1890, part of a substantial restoration and refurbishment which began in 1881.

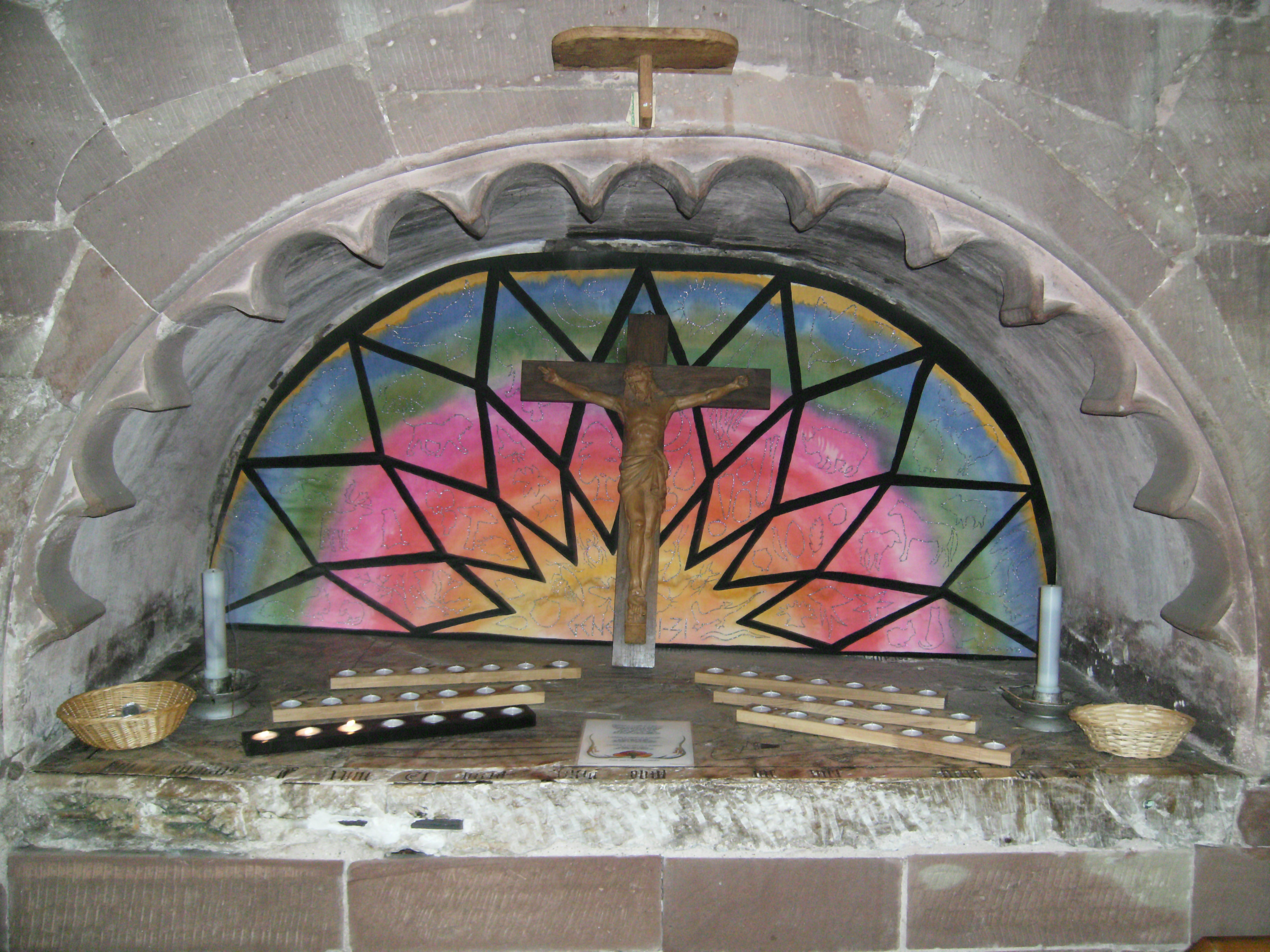
The early-16th-century tomb alcove of Richard Littleton and Alice Wynnesbury in the south nave aisle, now used for votive candles. Originally this part of the church was a Littleton family chapel.

Penkridge church several times had to make a stand to preserve its independence against both the diocese of Coventry and Lichfield and the wider Province of Canterbury. In 1259 the Archdeacon of Stafford tried to carry out a canonical visitation, a tour of inspection, on behalf of the diocese. Henry III wrote personally to him, ordering him to desist. The Second Council of Lyons in 1274 denounced a number of abuses for which the prebendaries of the chapels royal were notorious, including non-residence and pluralism. In 1280 the Archbishop of Canterbury, John Peckham, fired with righteous indignation by the council's strictures, tried to carry out a visitation of all the royal chapels that lay within the Coventry and Lichfield diocese. The Penkridge College denied him access to the church, as did those of Wolverhampton, Tettenhall and Stafford, although the latter had to be ordered to resist by a letter from the king, Edward I. The canons of Penkridge appealed to the Pope, while Peckham pronounced excommunication upon them. However, he took care to exclude from his sentence John de Derlington, dean of Penkridge and Archbishop of Dublin, and thus his peer. After more than a year of threats and negotiations, pressure from the king compelled Peckham to drop the issue quietly. There were similar wrangles throughout the 14th century about whether the pope could appoint canons to prebends at the church. After lengthy and complex manoeuvres, the Crown emerged victorious around 1380, under Richard II, who was able to profit from the schism in the Papacy. The only major lapse came in 1401, when Henry IV, having seized the throne from Richard, was heavily dependent on the support Thomas Arundel, then Archbishop of Canterbury. Arundel used the opportunity to force through a visitation of all the chapels royal in Staffordshire, Penkridge included. Every member of the chapter or deputy was subjected to secret interrogation by two of Arundel's commissioners, and some parishioners were also brought in for questioning, although there were no great consequences for the college.

Once the deanery became fixed on the archbishops of Dublin, the deans were almost always absentees. It seems that most of the canons too were usually absent. This was not unusual in the collegiate churches: the record at Wolverhampton was much worse. There was an inevitable tension between the status of St. Michael's as a chapel royal and its role as a village church. The primary use to which kings put their chapels was as chantries - institutions in which daily prayers and masses were said for the souls of the monarchs and royal family. This would have been the case from the foundation of the church, but by the mid-14th century there were two priests specifically responsible for this function, one for the Chantry of the King, the other for the Chantry of the Virgin Mary. This focus on the dead was only one issue distancing the church from the concerns of the local community. Essentially it was a national rather than a local institution. Its primary purpose was to serve the monarchy and one of the ways it did this was by providing an avenue for preferment. Appointment to the chapter of a wealthy cathedral or chapel was a means of enriching key royal ministers or supporters, so such appointments were not made with the needs of the community in mind, and they were often held in combination with many similar posts. The regular worship was conducted by vicars and other priests, usually paid by the prebendaries or from special funds set up for the purpose. Occasionally abuses and corruption surfaced. Royal inquisitions in 1261 and 1321 found that those canons who were resident tended to make free with the property of the college, at the expense of the absentees, and the 1321 inquiry also implicated the chantry priests in wasting resources. By the late Middle Ages, the expectations of ordinary people were beginning to rise and there was a demand for more participation in worship by the laity. Consequently, by the 16th century, the people of Penkridge were paying for their own morrow-mass priest, who ensured there was a daily mass for the people to attend.

In 1837, the church was separated from its vicarage by the building of the Grand Junction Railway; a foot tunnel under the line was provided to allow the curate to move between the two, and the vicarage, "a house of considerable size, with an Italian roof", was expanded and improved at the railway company's expense, in compensation.

=== Magnates and manors ===
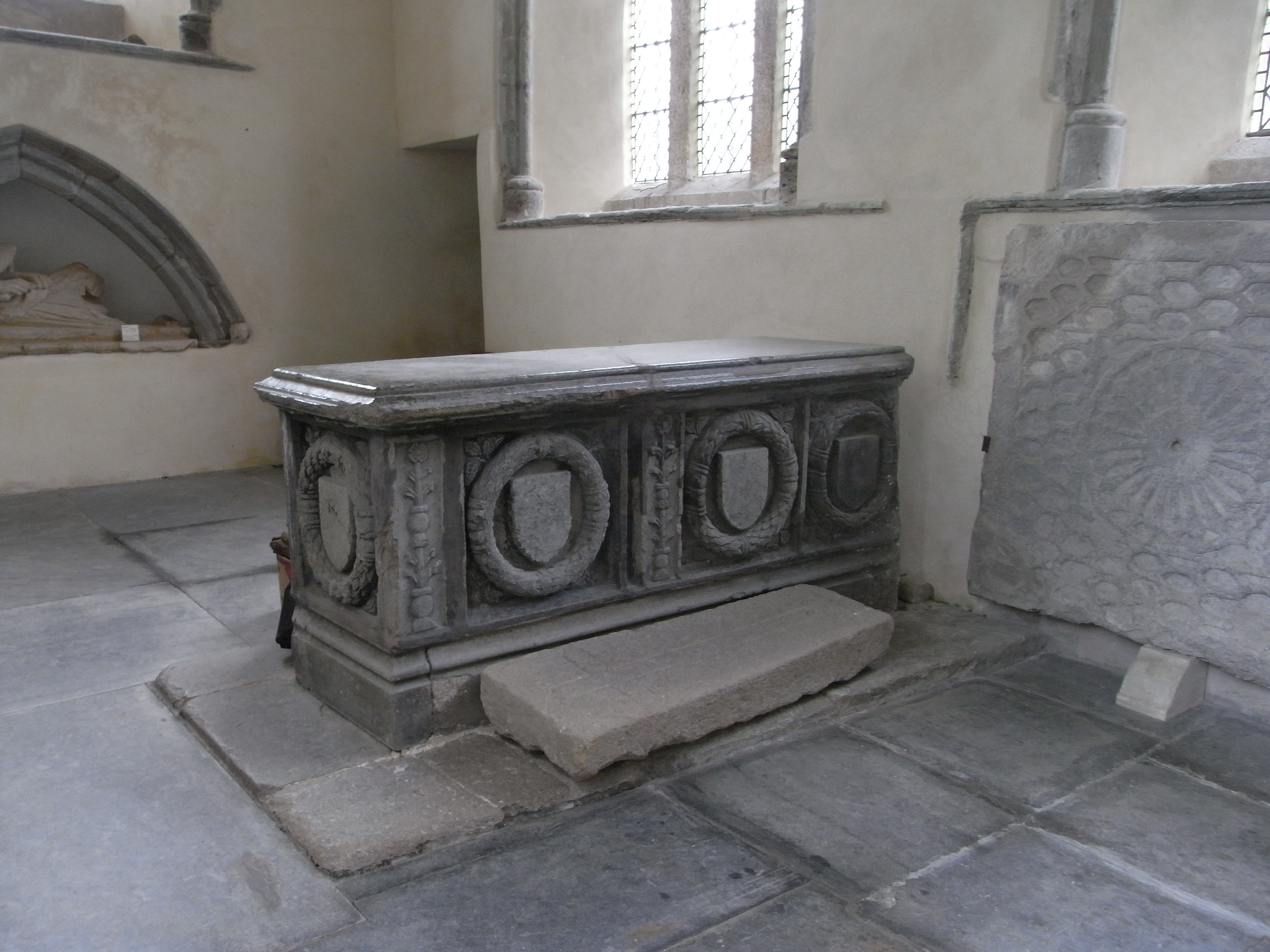
Chest tomb c.1530 thought to be that of Robert Willougby, 2nd Baron Willoughby de Broke, north transept, St.Andrew's Church, Bere Ferrers, Devon. He became lord of Penkridge in the early 16th century.

Economic and social life in medieval Penkridge were enacted within the manor, the basic territorial unit of feudal society, which regulated the economic and social relationships of its members and enforced the law on them. The manor was sometimes co-extensive with the village, but not always. Penkridge was initially a royal manor, a situation that still had real meaning in 1086, when Domesday found that the king had land and a mill at Penkridge being directly worked for him by a small team. The situation changed, probably in the 12th century, when one of the kings gave it as a fief to the Hose or Hussey family, paving the way for its subsequent grant to Archbishop Henry de Loundres, who divided it into lay and deanery manors for his family and ecclesiastical successors respectively. This did not go unchallenged, and the Husseys raised claims to Penkridge occasionally until the 16th century - a lingering dispute typical of feudal land tenure - although their actual possessions shrank to a couple of small holdings at Wolgarston. Penkridge manor and the Deanery Manor were by no means the only manors within Penkridge parish. In fact, there were many, of various sizes and tenures. A list of the different medieval manors and estates would include:

- Penkridge Manor. This passed through the Blund or Blount family until, in 1363, John Blount conveyed it to John de Beverley. This sale was contested by John's mother, Joyce, who claimed a third back as part of her dowry. Ultimately the manor was conveyed whole to John de Beverley and, on his death in 1480, to his widow, Amice, who survived until 1416. Amice held the manor in her own name in chief, i.e. directly from the king, by knight service, i.e. in return for supplying military assistance to the king. Amice leased half the manor to Sir Humphrey Stafford of Hook, in Dorset and her heirs sold this land to him. The exact history of the other half is unclear, but Humphrey's grandson, also called Humphrey, seems to have reunited the manor under his control and was known as "Lord of Penkridge" in his later years. These Humphrey Staffords were distant relatives of the local de Staffords. The younger Humphrey died in 1461 and Penkridge passed, via his heirs, into the hands of Robert Willoughby, 2nd Baron Willoughby de Broke, a distinguished soldier and courtier of Henry VIII.
- Penkridge Deanery Manor, held by successive Archbishops of Dublin from the 1220s.

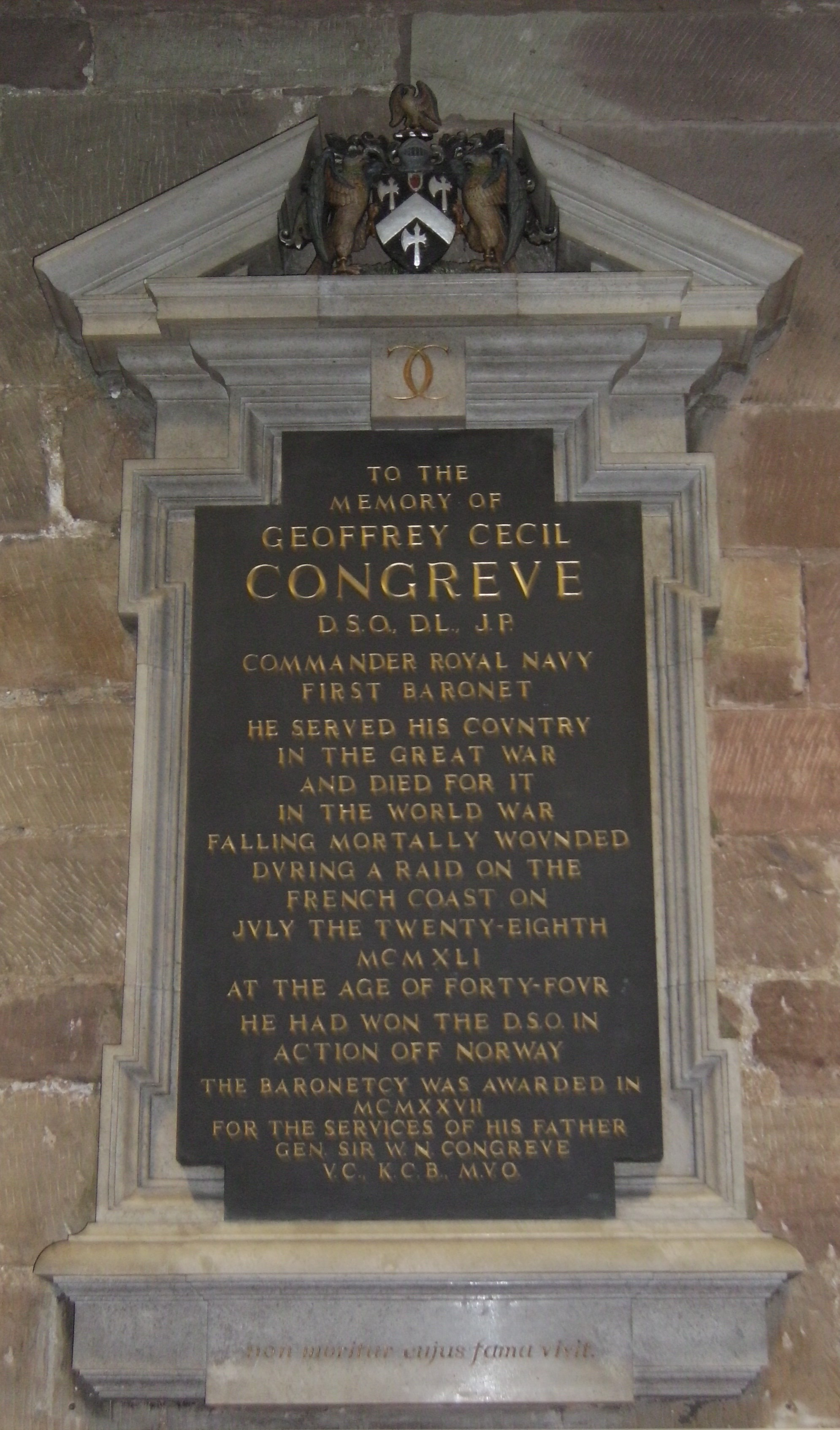
Memorial to Geoffrey Congreve, killed in action 1941

- Congreve, which was originally a part or "member" of Penkridge manor. As late as the 19th century, the lords of Congreve paid a tiny rent, £1 1s., to the lords of Penkridge. In the 13th century the Teveray family became established at Congreve, although not without protracted disputes, and by 1302 it was being described as a manor. In the 14th century, the Dumbleton family acquired all the rights from the disputing parties and were soon being addressed as de Congreve. The same Congreve family held the manor until modern times, residing at Congreve Manor House.
- Congreve Prebendal Manor, which belonged to St. Michael's College, and was centred on Congreve House, about 250m. from the Manor House.
- Drayton, also originally a part of Penkridge manor. The overlordship was held by the de Staffords from the 12th century and the Barons Stafford claimed it for centuries after. However, Hervey Bagot, who had married Millicent de Stafford, got into protracted and complex legal difficulties over the tenure of Drayton. These were ultimately resolved by all parties agreeing to give the manor to the Augustinian priory of St. Thomas near Stafford.
- Gailey, which had once been granted to Burton Abbey by Wulfric Spot. By the 12th century the de Staffords were overlords and granted it as a fief to one Rennerius, who in turn gave it to the nuns of Blithbury priory. It then passed quickly to Black Ladies Priory, Brewood, before being acquired by the king around 1189, to become a hay or division of the royal forest of Cannock or Cannock Chase.
- Levedale, which also had the de Staffords as overlords. At Domesday the tenants were Brien and Drew and, for centuries after, the mesne lords, or intermediate tenants were descendants of Brien, the de Standon family. In the mid-12th century, the terre tenant, the actual resident lord of the manor, was Engenulf de Gresley, who had no sons but divided the manor among his three daughters. This unleashed a series of family disputes, legal wrangles and displays of petty greed that went on for centuries. For example, around 1272, Amice, widow of Henery of Verdun, a deceased lord of Levedale, abducted her own son from the custody of the overlord, Robert de Standon. Robert took Amice to court, where she was forced to admit to the facts of the case, and was ordered to return young Henry to Robert.
- Longridge, which seems to have belonged to the prebend of Coppenhall, and so formed part of the estates of St. Michael's College. However, a number of small landowners held a considerable part of it, apparently as tenants of the prebend.
- Lyne Hill or Linhull, apparently belonging to the deanery, but mainly in the hands of a family who are called variously de Linhill, de Lynhull, Lynell or Lynehill.
- Mitton, which had the de Staffords as overlords and the de Standons as mesne lords, like Levedale. By the mid-11th century, it was in the hands of a family known as de Mutton. Isabel de Mutton inherited the estate while still an infant around 1241 and was taken into the custody of Robert de Stafford. Custody was contested by the de Standons, who claimed the de Muttons were their direct tenants at Mitton, and that they were 40s. out of pocket because of Robert's high-handed actions. Robert claimed, on the contrary, that the de Mittons held two other properties directly of himself. The de Standons argued that theirs was a prior claim. After a long wrangle, Robert de Stafford agreed to hand over the heiress to the de Standons. Later Isabel married Philip de Chetwynd of Ingestre. He almost lost Mitton during the Second Barons' War. He was accused of helping Ralph Basset of Drayton Bassett to seize Stafford and hold it against a royalist army. His estates were forfeit but under the Dictum of Kenilworth he was allowed to redeem them from Robert Blundel, who had been given the redemption by the King. He stoutly maintained his innocence of all charges throughout. Mitton passed into the estates of the Chetwynd family of Ingestre through the son of Isabel and Philip, also called Philip. During her second marriage, to Roger de Thornton, Isabel energetically harried tenants whom she accused of cutting down trees and taking fish from her pools.
- La More (later Moor Hall), a small manor to just west of Penkridge. Its overlord was the church of St. Michael, to which it returned whenever there was an interregnum among the tenants, the de la More family. The chief of these occurred from 1293, when William de la More was hanged for a felony.
- Otherton, another small manor, but old enough to be mentioned in Domesday. In late Anglo-Saxon times it was held by Ailric, but by 1886 it was part of the de Stafford barony, although held by Clodoan. In the 13th century the overlordship passed to the de Loges family of Great Wyrley and in the 14th to the lords of Rodbaston, the de Haughton family. The manor was actually held by a local family who took their surname from it, the de Othertons, until it passed to the Wynnesbury family of Pillaton in the 15th century.
- Pillaton, a small manor east of Penkridge. The overlord was Burton Abbey, which had received the land from Wulfric Spot in 1044. It was held from the abbey by a succession of families and became part of the Wynnesbury lands in the 15th century.
- Preston, which belonged to the College of St. Michael after it was made part of the prebend of Penkridge by the gift of a woman called Avice in the mid-13th century. The canons let it to a succession of tenants, who paid a tithe to the prebend.
- Rodbaston, which also existed before the Norman Conquest, and was held by an Anglo-Saxon free man called Alli in 1066. After belonging for some centuries to the lords of Great Wyrley, it was united with Penkridge manor in the hands of John de Beverley around 1372.
- Water Eaton, another pre-Conquest manor that came under de Stafford overlordship. They let it to the de Stretton family, who subsequently became overlords and let it to sub-tenants. These were the de Beysin family, who became embroiled in a protract disputes with the Crown over encroachments on the estate by the royal forest. In 1315 they went so far as to petition Parliament for an enquiry into the matter. Ultimately the de Beysins rented out the land and ceased to live locally.

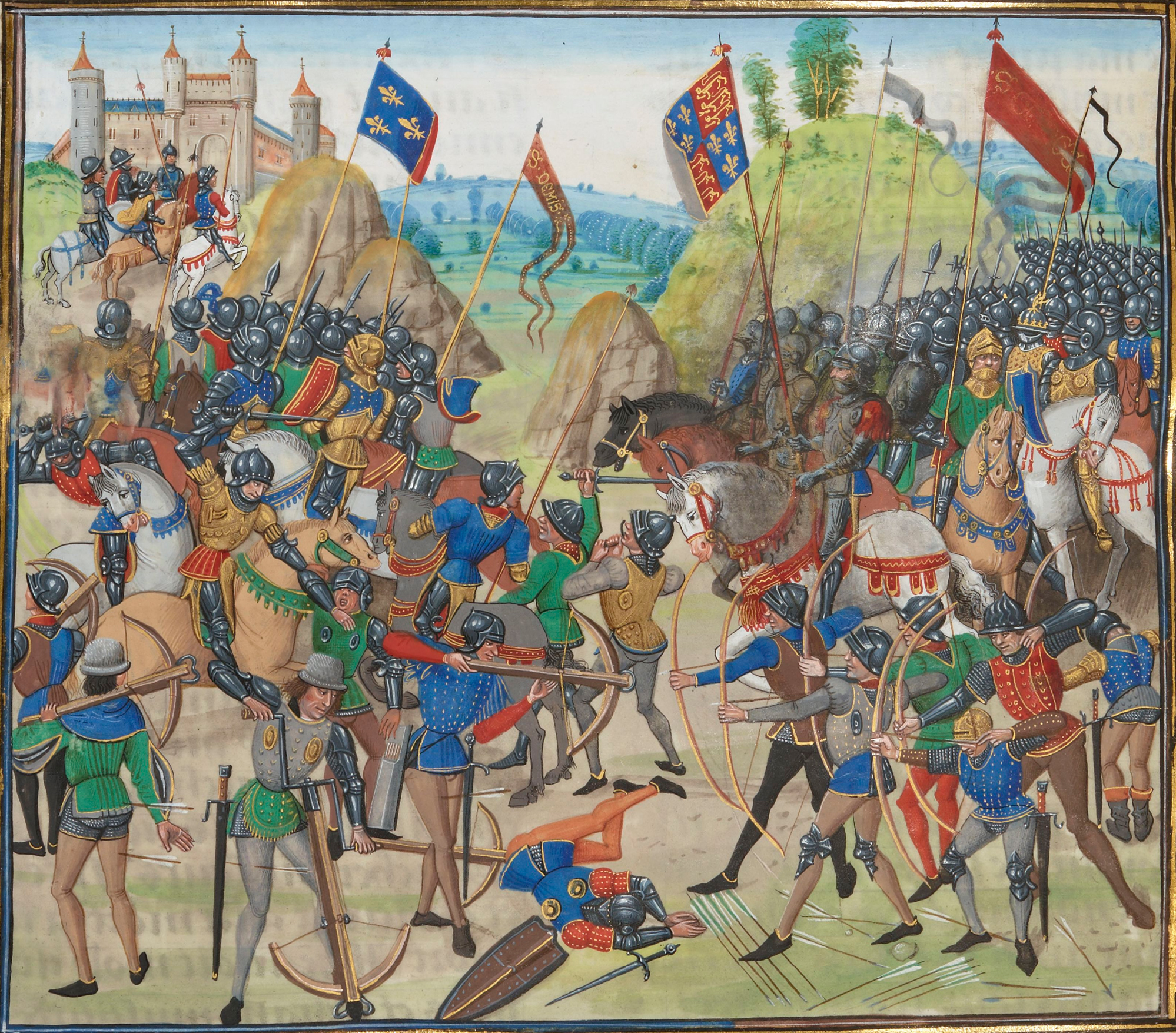
Battle of Crécy between the English and French in the Hundred Years' War, from a 15th-century manuscript of Froissart's Chronicles. John de Whiston fought as a knight in the battle.

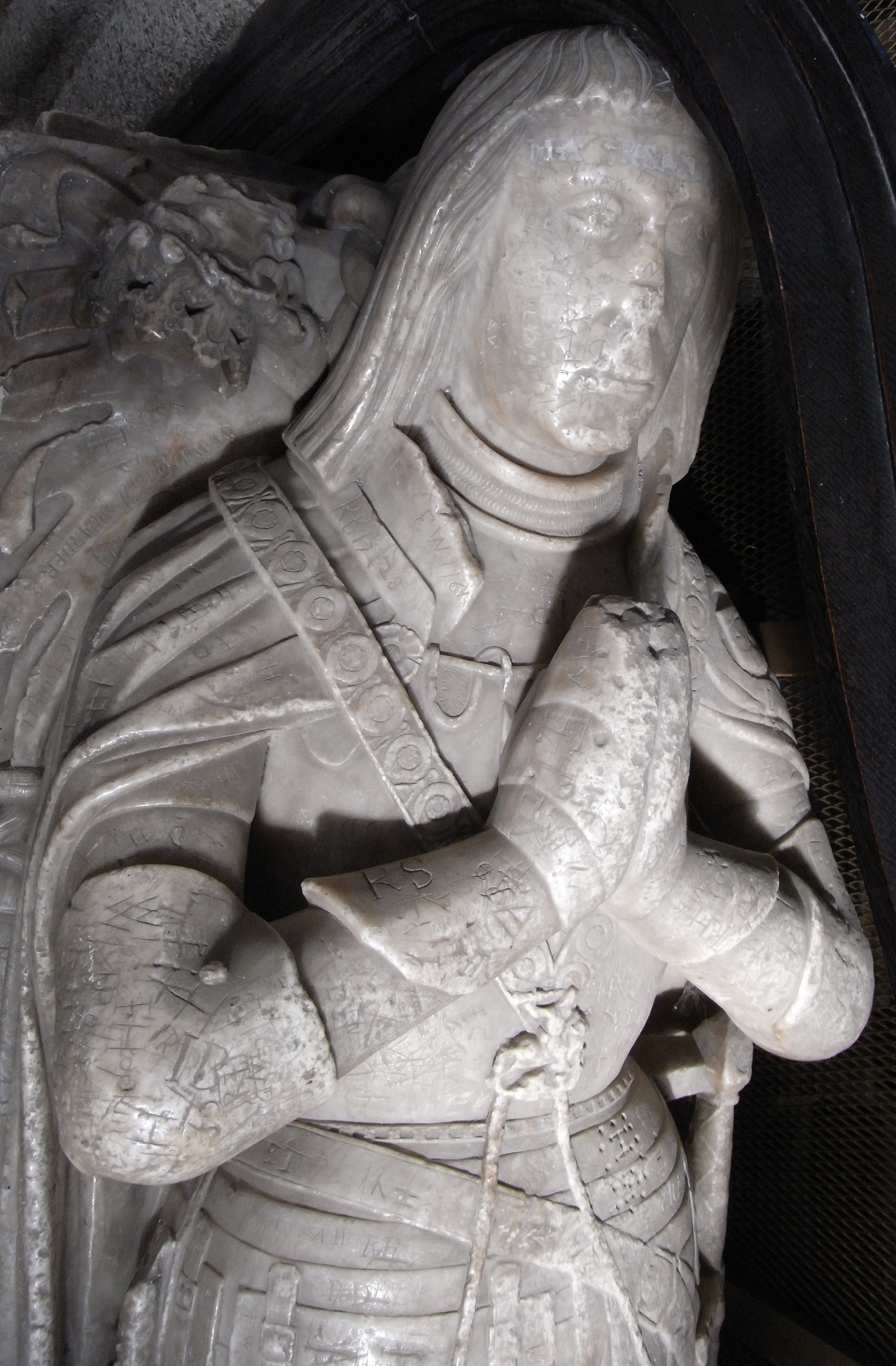
Effigy of Robert Willoughby, 1st Baron Willoughby de Broke (d.1502), St Mary's Church, Callington, Cornwall. With the Willoughby family and their successors, the Grevilles, Coppenhall's history came into parallel with that of Penkridge, which they also acquired in the 16th century.

- Whiston, which came under the overlordship of Burton Abbey from 1004. One of the tenants, a John de Whiston, fought as a knight at the Battle of Crécy in 1346. Subsequently the manor fell into a slough of litigation when a succession of short-lived lords of the manor (probably the result of the Black Death, left their heirs intractable problems of tenure.
- Coppenhall or Copehale, now a separate parish from Penkridge, although part of it in the middle ages. It was a manor in Anglo-Saxon times and at Domesday the overlords were the de Staffords, although the tenant was a man called Bueret. His sone, Ulpher de Coppenhall, divided the manor in two, introducing the Bagot family, whose half was called the Hyde. The Bagots seem to have been prone to particularly vicious family disputes. The Staffordshire Plea rolls for 1250 record that Ascira, the widow of Robert Bagot, sued William Bagot, presumably her stepson, for a third of various properties at Coppenhall and the Hyde, and elsewhere, as her dower. William replied that Ascira had never been lawfully married to his father, and the case was referred to the Bishop of Worcester. The Bagots maintained a presence at the Hyde until the 14th century, when the line died out and the land reverted to the de Staffords. Edmund Stafford, 5th Earl of Stafford, died fighting for Henry IV at the Battle of Shrewsbury. The infant heir became the king's ward and Henry used the opportunity to grant part of Coppenhall to his new wife, Joan of Navarre. The remainder stayed with the Barons Stafford and they granted it to their relatives, the de Staffords of Hooke, Dorset. After further disputes and complications, it ended in the hands of Robert Willoughby, 1st Baron Willoughby de Broke.
- Dunston, originally a member of Penkridge manor. By 1166, Robert de Stafford was recognised as overlord and Hervey de Stretton was his tenant at Dunston, although the de Staffords themselves retained land at Dunston at least until the 16th century. The lordship and the bulk of the land descended in the de Stretton family for several generations but, by 1285, they were renting most of their land to the Pickstock family, and in 1316 John Pickstock was named as lord of Dunston. The Pickstocks's were burgesses of the county town of Stafford and remained lords of the manor for several generations until John Pickstock granted most of his lands to members of the Derrington family in 1437.
- Stretton, also now outside Penkridge parish. Before the Norman Conquest it had been held by three thegns, but Domesday found it held by Hervey de Stretton under the overlordship of Robert de Stafford. By the 14th century the Congreve family owned the manor.

The complexity of land tenure in feudal Penkridge is obvious. The actual cultivators, mainly villeins and other lowly labourers, were at the bottom of a social pyramid that could have four or five layers under the king at its apex. This was due to the practice of subinfeudation, by which estates were constantly granted and re-granted, often sub-divided, in return for feudal dues - typically military service. Low life expectancy, especially during times of war and plague, created constant succession disputes. A common complaint was that of the widow, often neglected by children or step-children, who then launched legal action to regain life interest in part of the estate - usually a third. Infant heirs fell into the clutches of the overlord, sometimes the king, who was in a position to exploit the estate unmercifully during the minority and to extort a hefty feudal relief on succession, as did John and Henry IV. Lack of a male heir often led to temporary or permanent division of an estate among daughters, giving ample opportunity for further family dispute. It was this sort of dispute finally exasperated Hervey Bagot and his rivals and induced them to give Drayton to the Church.

The Staffords were a powerful family with many branches, and with great influence in regional and national affairs, stemming from a grant of large estates to Robert de Stafford by William the Conqueror. They were important as both overlords and as actual working landowners in the region around Stafford, including Penkridge parish. Beneath them came a class of middling landowners, who often had many holdings at different levels in the feudal pyramid. A good example was Hugh de Loges, a mid-13th-century baron, who was lord of Great Wyrley in Cannock; lord of Lyne Hill in Penkridge, which he probably held of the Penkridge deanery manor; lord of Otherton, where he owed fealty to the de Staffords; and lord of Rodbaston, which he held by serjeanty in Cannock Chase. The Church was a major landowner in Penkridge and the extent of church holdings was to have important consequences during the Reformation, as church property was seized by the Crown. However, many estates were very small, with petty manorial lords struggling to meet their dues and debts.

Even the most minor lord of the manors had great power over his tenants, especially the villeins and others bound to the estate. Typical of the rights enjoyed by a small manorial lord would be those claimed by St. Michael's at La More in 1293:

- View of frankpledge - holding tenants collectively responsible for lawbreaking
- Assize of Bread and Ale - regulating the price and quality of foodstuffs and imposing fines on offenders
- Infangthief - pursuit and punishment of offenders within the manor.

A more important landowner, like John de Beverley, in 1372 acquired the rights of:

- Outfangthief - transferring offenders caught outside the manor to his own court for summary justice
- Gallows - capital punishment of offenders
- Waif and stray - confiscating any animal found wandering or lost.

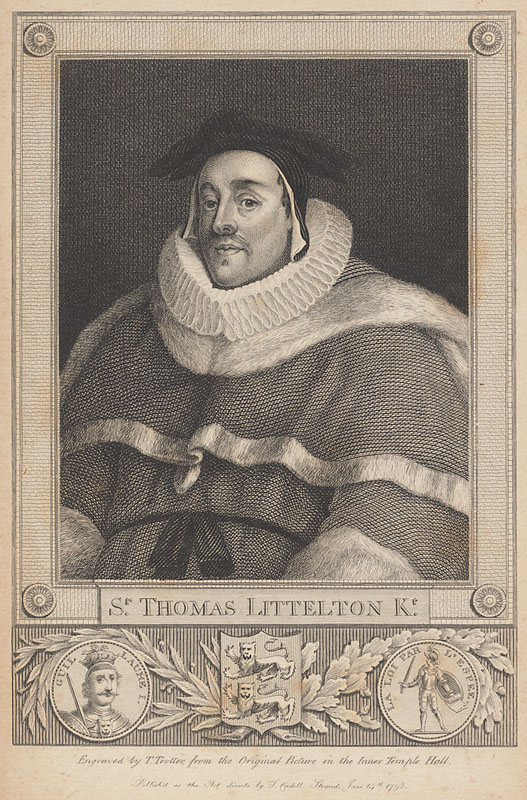
Sir Thomas de Littleton, ancestor of the Littleton family of Penkridge. An 18th-century engraving after a 15th-century painting.

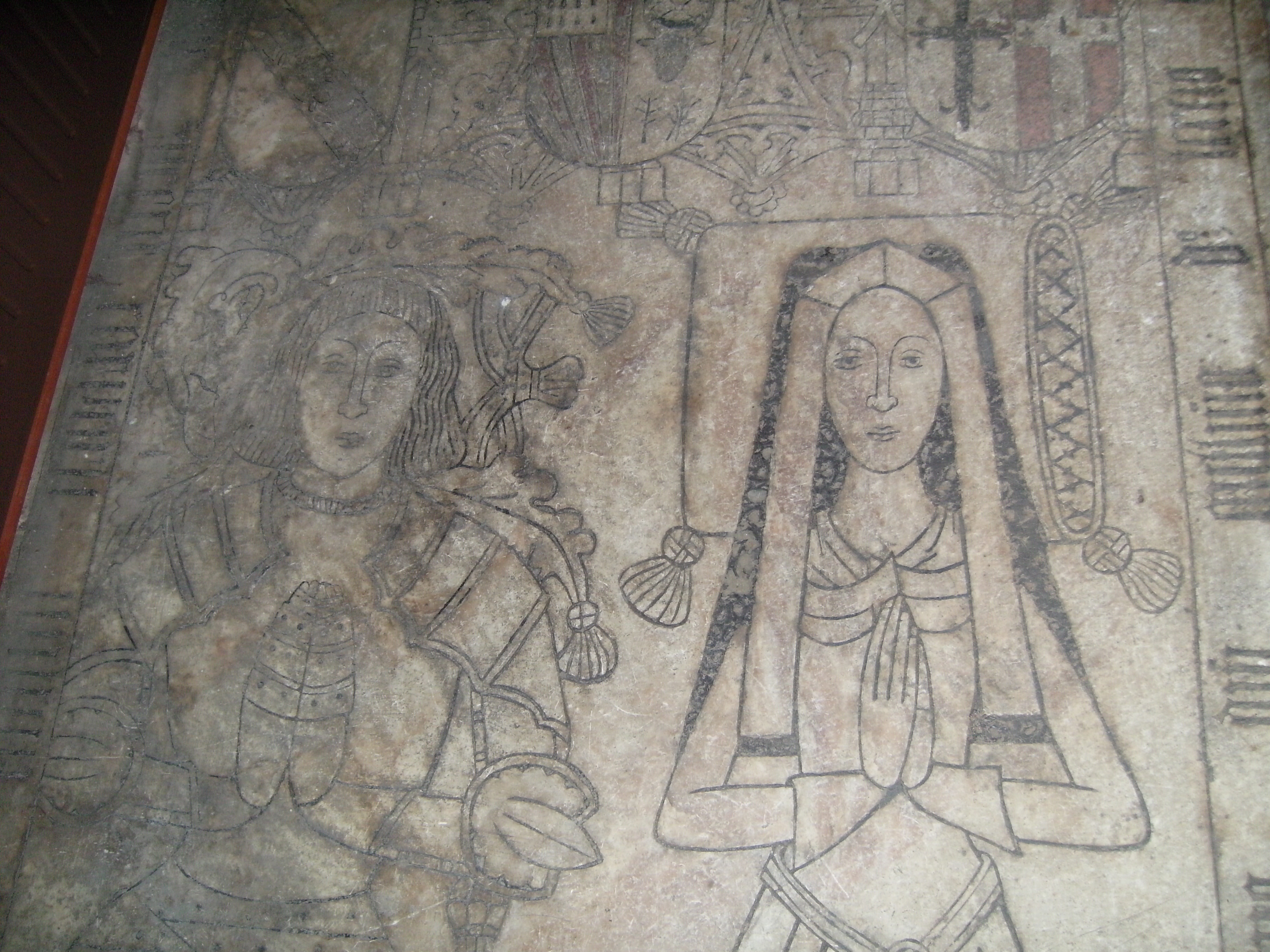
William Wynnesbury of Pillaton Hall and his wife. From their memorial, in the floor of the south chancel aisle, St. Michael's church.

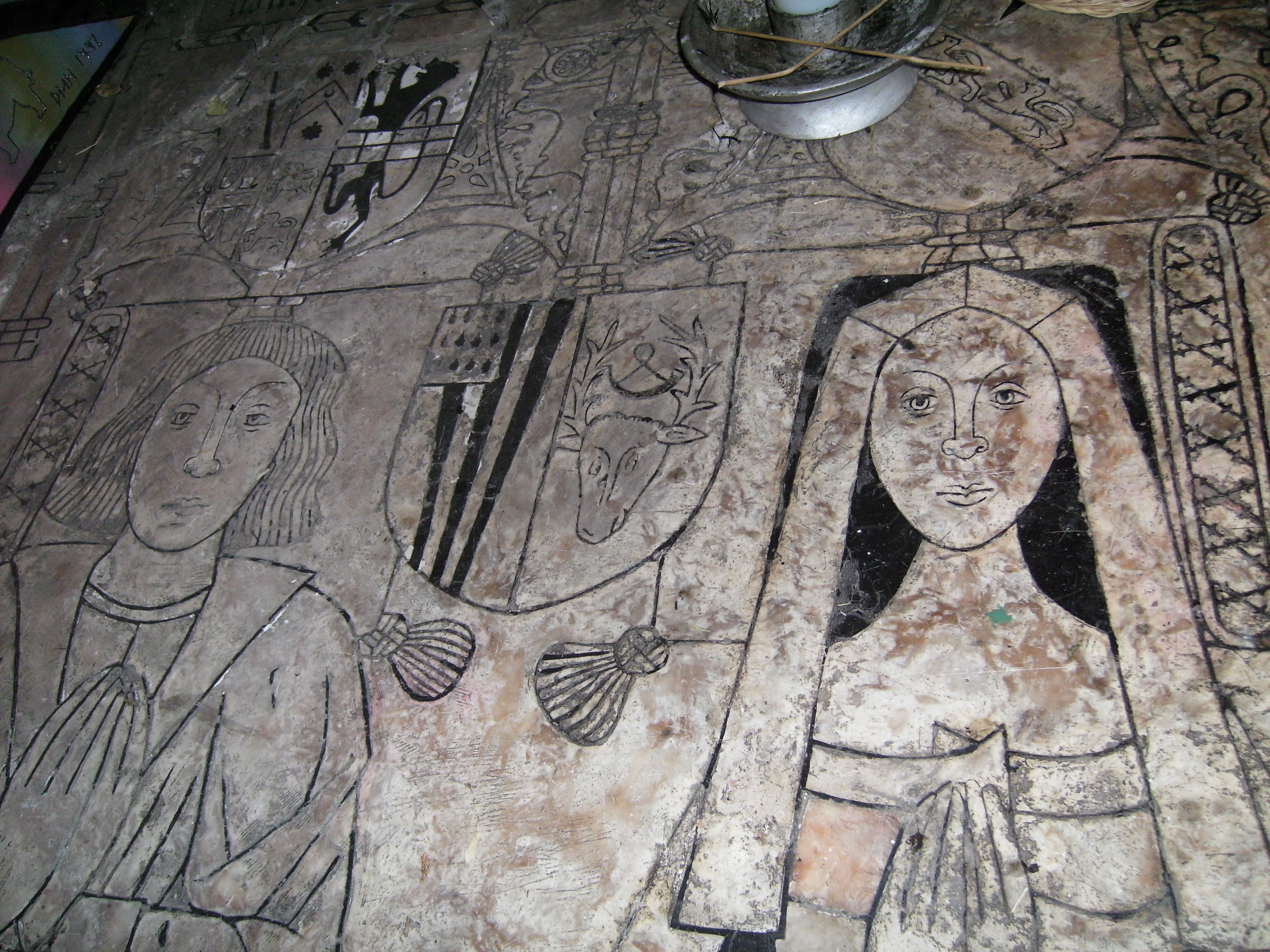
Richard Littleton and Alice Wynnesbury, on incised slab of their recessed table tomb in the south nave aisle, St. Michael's church.

From the 14th century, the feudal system in Penkridge, as elsewhere, began to break down. Edward I's law Quia Emptores of 1290 changed the legal framework radically by banning subinfeudation. The Black Death and population collapse of the 14th century made labour expensive and land relatively cheap, encouraging landowners to look for money from rents, with which they paid for labour. In the 15th century, a new regime of cash, commodities, wages, rents and leases took shape, and with it came great changes in land tenure.

The most important beneficiaries were to be the Littleton family. Richard Littleton was the second son of Thomas de Littleton, a prominent jurist from Frankley, Worcestershire. Thomas had direct connections to the area, as he had married Joan Burley, widow of the fifth Philip Chetwynd, lord of Mitton. Richard first appears as a tenant and perhaps steward of William Wynnesbury, who held Pillaton and Otherton in the late 15th century. Richard married Alice, his landlord's daughter, who inherited the estates When William died in 1502. Alice passed them on her death to her son, Sir Edward Littleton. Pillaton Hall, which they rebuilt, was to be the seat of the Littletons for two and a half centuries, and from it they built a property empire, using leases as the key. Land leases - typically of twenty years - gave them effective management of larger and larger estates. When the opportunity to buy appeared, they were in the best position to do so, as an extant lease deterred other buyers. Richard died in 1518, although Alice survived him by eleven years. They were buried in a table tomb in a new family chapel in St. Michael's church.

=== The traditional economy ===
Medieval Penkridge was clearly a place of ecclesiastical and commercial importance, but most of its population was at least partly dependent on agriculture for a living. Agricultural expansion was greatly impeded by the Forest Law imposed after the Norman Conquest, which preserved the wildlife and ecology of the area for the king's enjoyment through a savage penal code. Large areas surrounding Penkridge were incorporated into the Royal Forest of Cannock or Cannock Chase, forming the divisions of the forest known as Gailey Hay and Teddesley Hay. The forest extended in a broad arc across Staffordshire, with Cannock Chase bordering Brewood Forest at the River Penk, and the latter stretching to meet Kinver Forest to the south. The First Barons' War of the 13th century initiated a process of gradual relaxation of the laws, starting with the first issue of the Forest Charter in 1217. So it was in Henry III's reign that Penkridge began to grow economically and probably in population. Local people were quick to seize any chance that presented itself. In the mid-13th century there were complaints about assarting, clearing of trees and scrub to create fields, by the residents of Otherton and Pillaton. However, the struggle against the forests was not over. At times the kings' servants tried to push forward the boundaries of the forest, particularly from Gailey Hay along the southern edge of the parish.

Much of the area was cultivated under the open field system. The names of the open fields and common meadows in Penkridge were recorded for the first time just as they were about to be enclosed, in the 16th and 17th centuries, although they must have existed throughout the Middle Ages. In Penkridge manor in the early 16th century, the open fields were Clay Field, Prince Field, Manstonshill, Mill Field, Wood Field, and Lowtherne or Lantern Field. In the 17th century there were mentions of Fyland, Old Field, and Whotcroft. Stretton Meadow and Hay Meadow seem to have been common grazing, the latter on the right bank of the Penk, between the Cuttlestone and Bull Bridges. The Deanery Manor had at least two open fields, called Longfurlong and Clay Field, the latter perhaps adjoining the land of the same name in Penkridge manor. In most of the smaller manors, too, open fields are known to have existed. For example, Rodbaston had Low Field, Overhighfield and Netherfield. Initially the cultivators were mainly unfree, villeins or even slaves, forced to work on the lord's land in return for their strips in the open fields. However, this pattern would have collapsed from the mid-14th century, as the Black Death drastically reduced the labour supply and, with it, the value of land. In 1535, as the Priory of St. Thomas faced dissolution, its manor of Drayton was worth £9 4s. 8d. annually, and the lion's share, £5 18s. 2d., came from rents. This pattern of commuting labour service for rent was more or less complete by this time and landlords used the money to buy in labour when required.

There are no detailed records of what was grown in medieval Penkridge. In 1801, when the first record was made, nearly half was under wheat, with barley, oats, peas, beans, and brassicas the other major crops - probably similar to the medieval pattern: farmers grew wheat wherever the land in their scattered strips supported it, and other crops elsewhere, with cattle on the riverside meadows and sheep on the heath.

=== Markets and mills ===
Markets were potentially very lucrative for manorial lords but it was necessary to obtain a royal charter before one could be instituted. Hugh Hose's grant of Penkridge manor to the Archbishop of Dublin in 1215 included the right to hold an annual fair, although it is not known whether Hugh had actually obtained the right to hold one. Nevertheless, Edward I recognised Hugh le Blund's right to a fair in 1278 and the grant was confirmed to Hugh and his heirs by Edward II in 1312. John de Beverley, got confirmation of the fair in 1364, and it passed down with the manor until at least 1617. The precise date varied considerably, but in the Middle Ages it fell around the end of September and lasted for seven or eight days. Although it was initially a general fair, it gradually grew into a horse fair.

Henry III granted Andrew le Blund a weekly market in 1244 and John de Beverley gained recognition for this also in 1364. When Amice, his widow remarried, the market was challenged as unfair competition to the burgesses of Stafford – an accusation they frequently made against markets in the area, including also that at Brewood. Presumably Amice vindicated her right to a market because she was able to pass it on to her successors at her death in 1416. For centuries the market was held every Tuesday. The marketplace was situated at the eastern end of the town, the opposite end from the church. It is still so-named, although it is no longer used for the purpose. After 1500 the market declined and faded out. It was revived several times, also changing days. The modern market is an entirely new institution on a different site.

Water power was plentiful in the Penkridge area, with the River Penk and a number of tributary brooks able to drive mills. Mills are regularly mentioned in land records and wills because they were such a source of profit to the owner. For the same reason, they were a major cause of grievance among tenants, who were compelled to use the lord's mill and to pay for the service, usually in kind. Domesday records a mill at Penkridge itself and another at Water Eaton. A century later there were two mills at Penkridge, one of them later named as the broc mill – presumably on one of the brooks that flow into the Penk. One of the Penkridge mills was given to William Houghton, Archbishop of Dublin, by the de la More family in 1298, but it appears that the same family continued to operate the mill, as a later archbishop granted them mill pond at an annual rent of 1d. in 1342. There was a mill at Drayton by 1194 and Hervey Bagot gave it to St. Thomas's Priory, along with the manor. Mills are recorded at Congreve, Pillaton, and Rodbaston in the 13th century, at Whiston in the 14th, and at Mitton in the 15th. These were all primarily corn mills, but water power was harnessed to many other purposes even in the Middle Ages: in 1345 we hear of a fulling mill at Water Eaton, as well as the corn mill.

Monuments to the Littletons in the church of St. Michael and All Angels, Penkridge

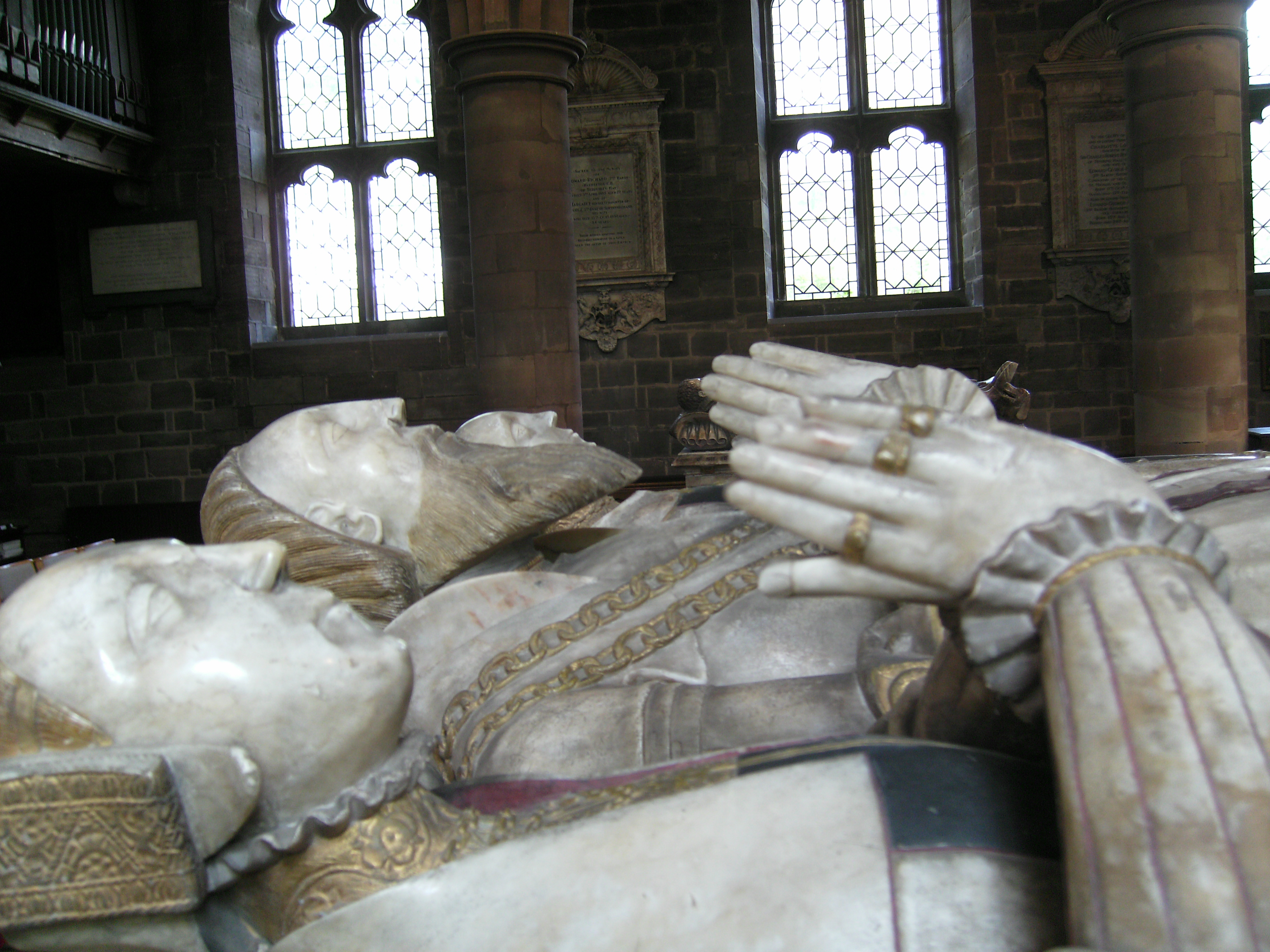
Tomb of Sir Edward Littleton (died 1558) and his wives, Helen Swynnerton and Isabel Wood. Attributed to the Royley workshop in Burton on Trent.

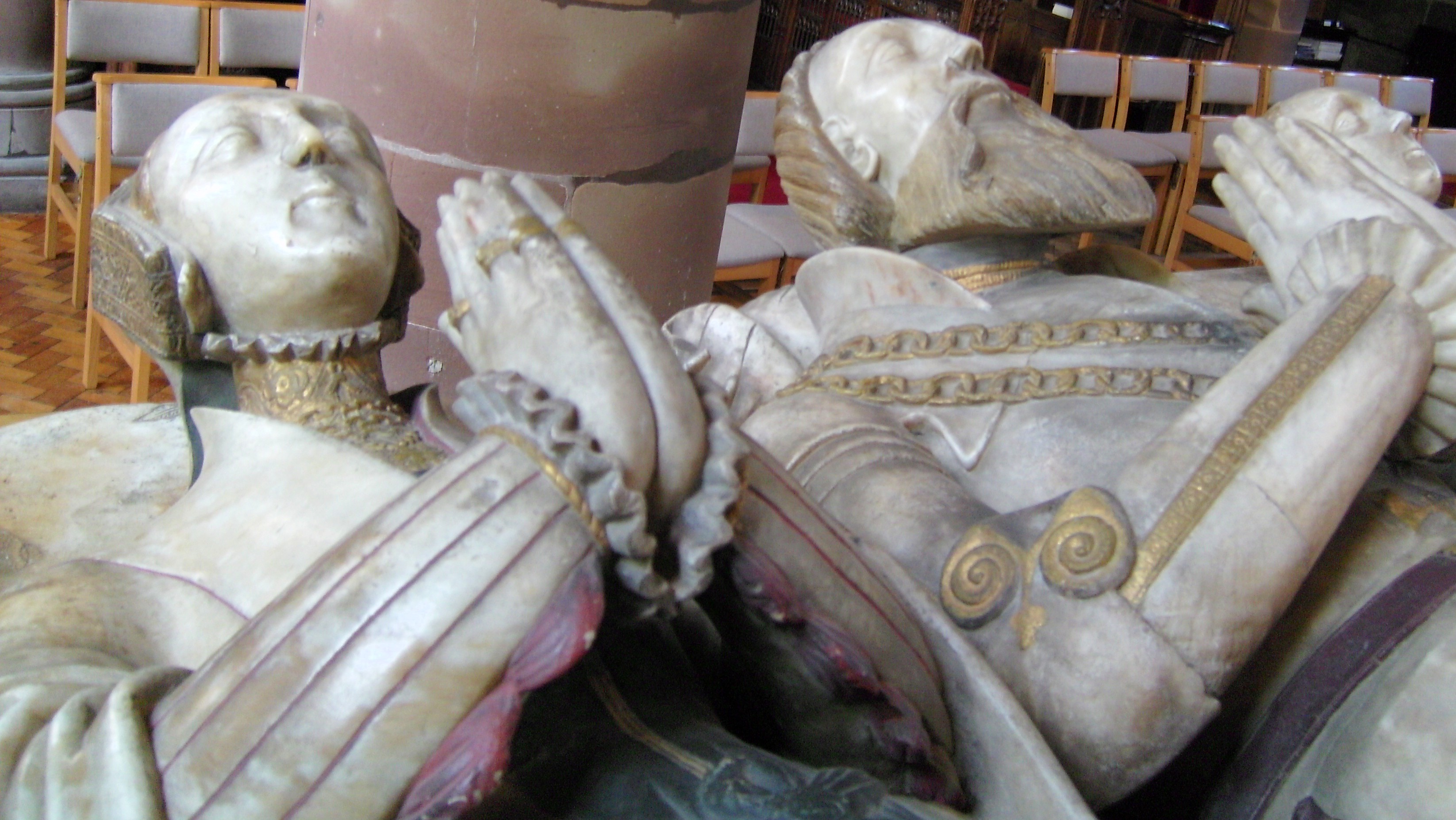
Helen Swynnerton's gable hood clearly places her in an earlier, pre-Reformation, age.

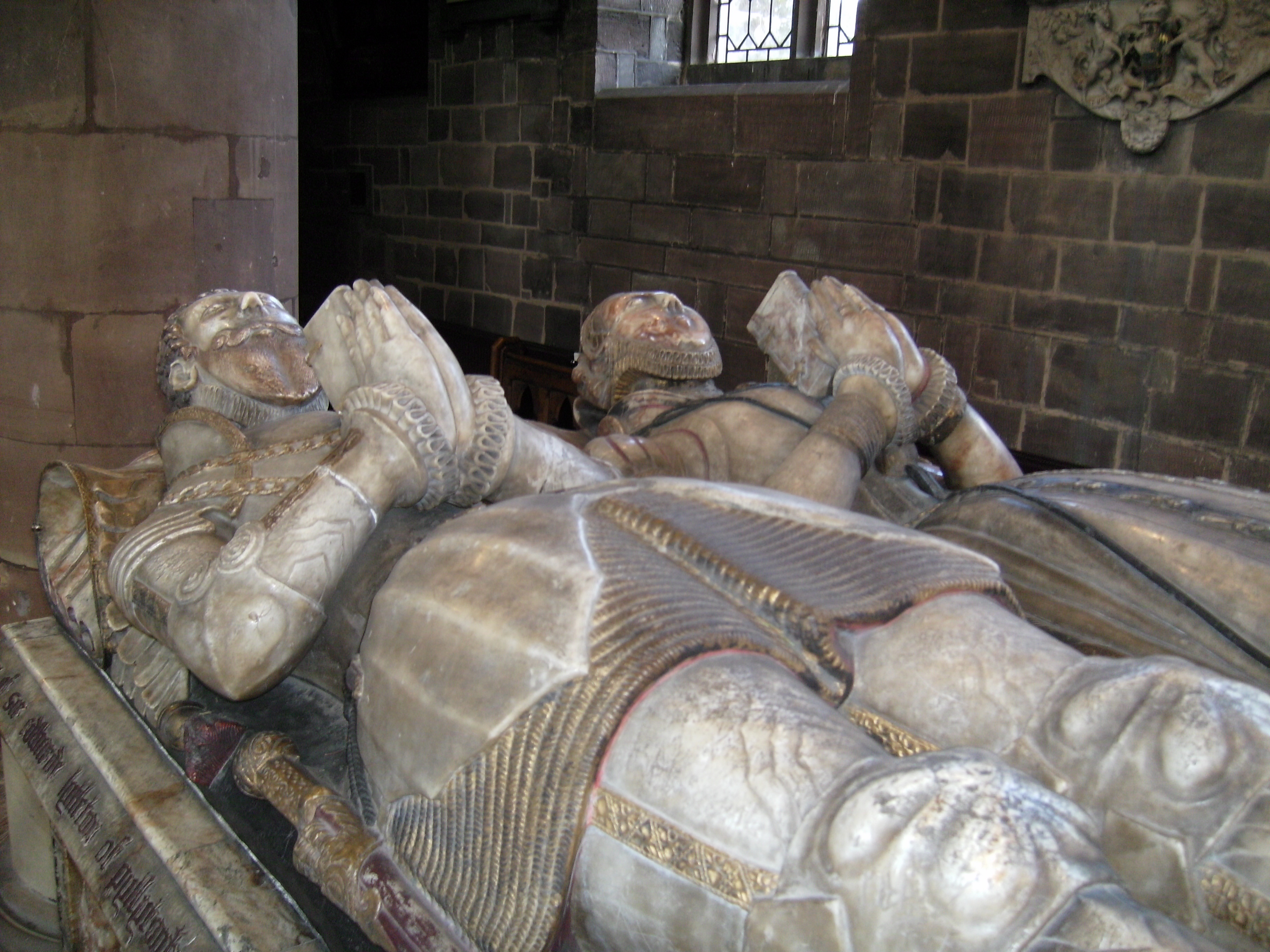
Tomb of Sir Edward Littleton (died 1574) and his wife, Alice Cockayne. The high ruffs for both are characteristic of the period. Attributed to the Royley workshop in Burton on Trent.

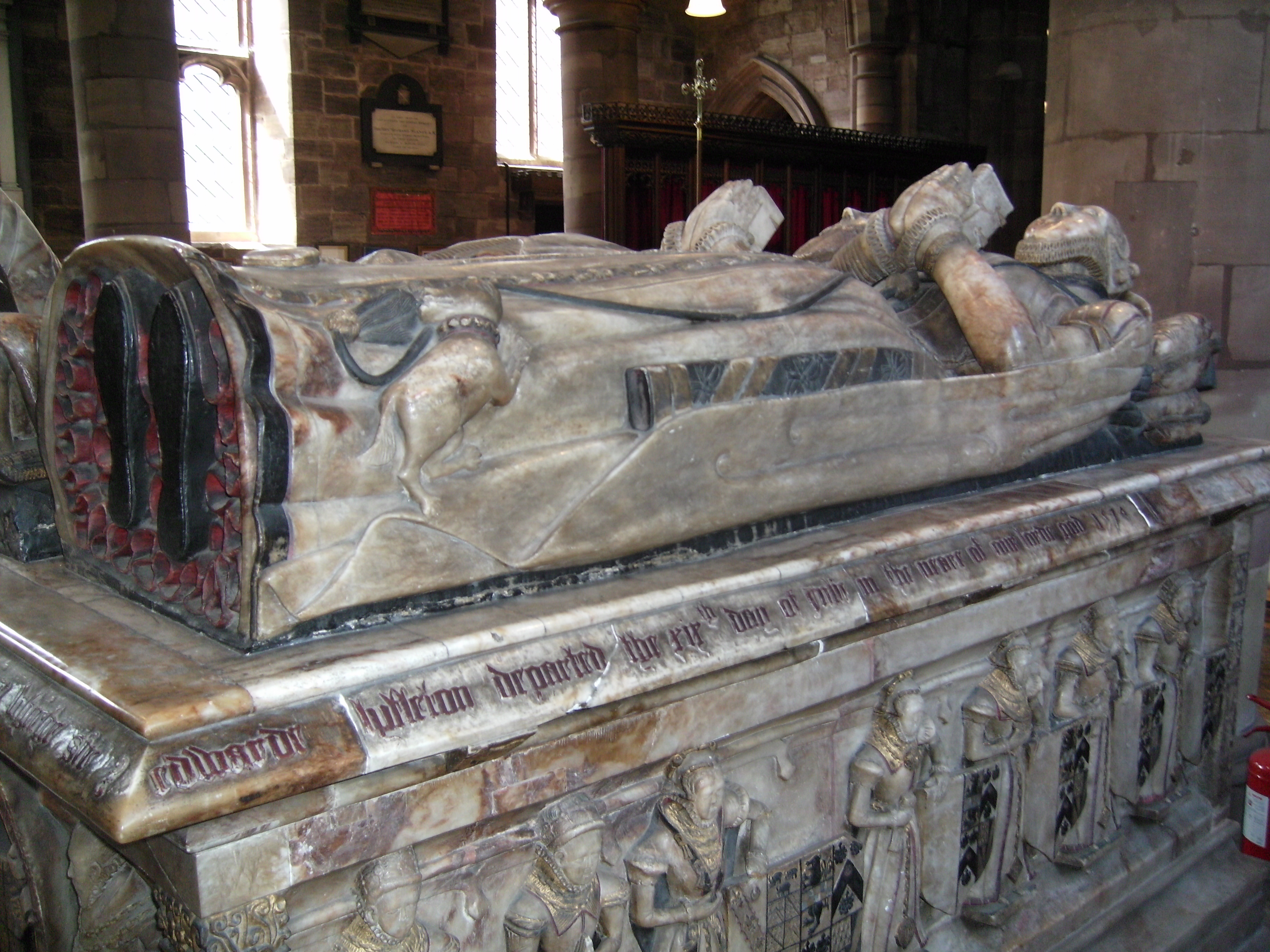
Alice Cockayne. The Royleys once again show intricate details of dress and fashion, while the modelling of faces is highly stereotypical.

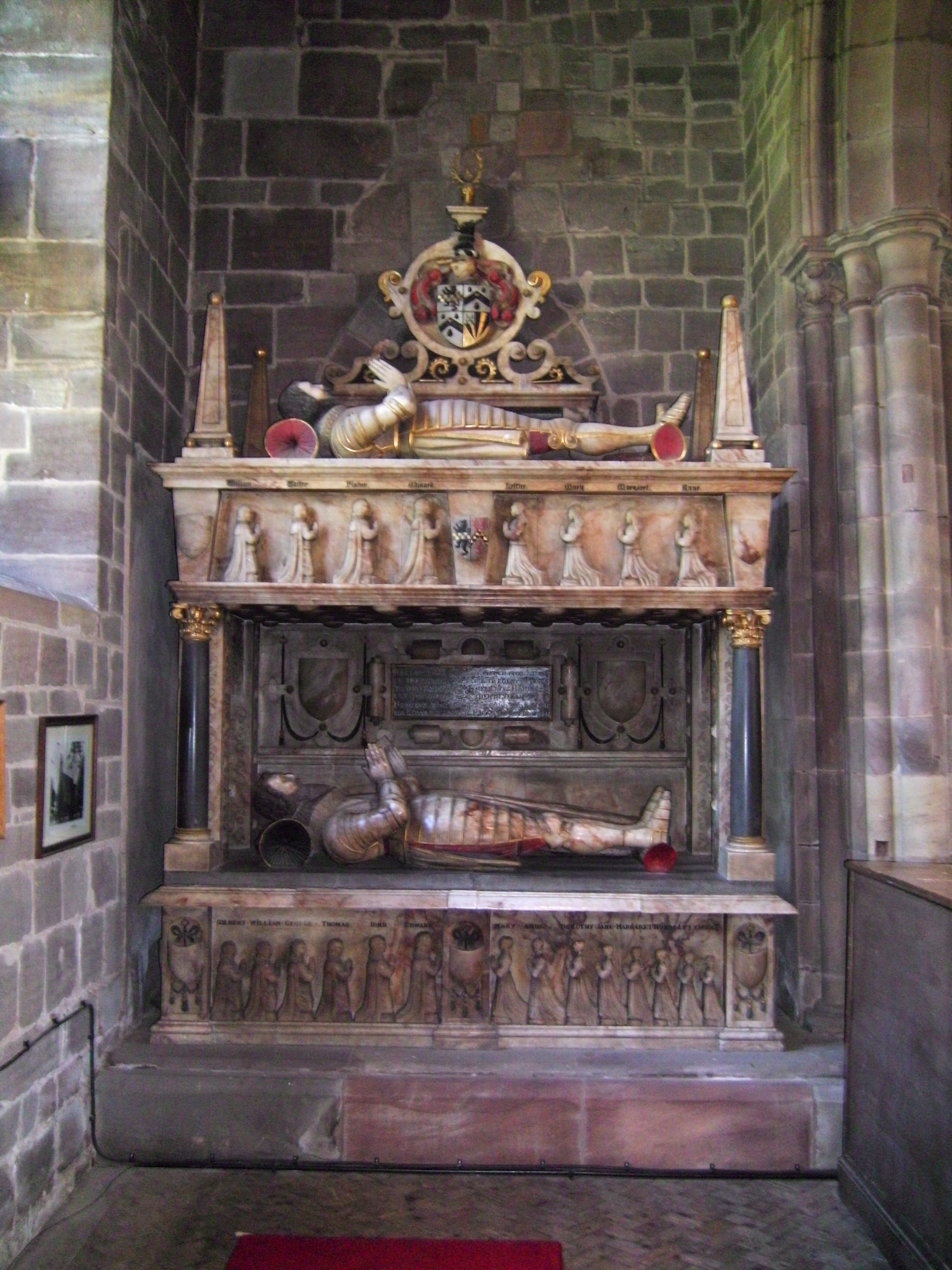
Tomb of two Sir Edward Littletons, father and son. East wall of north chancel aisle. Lower stage: Sir Edward Littleton (d. 1610) and his wife Margaret Devereux. Upper stage: Sir Edward (d. 1629), and his wife Mary Fisher. Their son, also Sir Edward, became the first baronet in 1627.

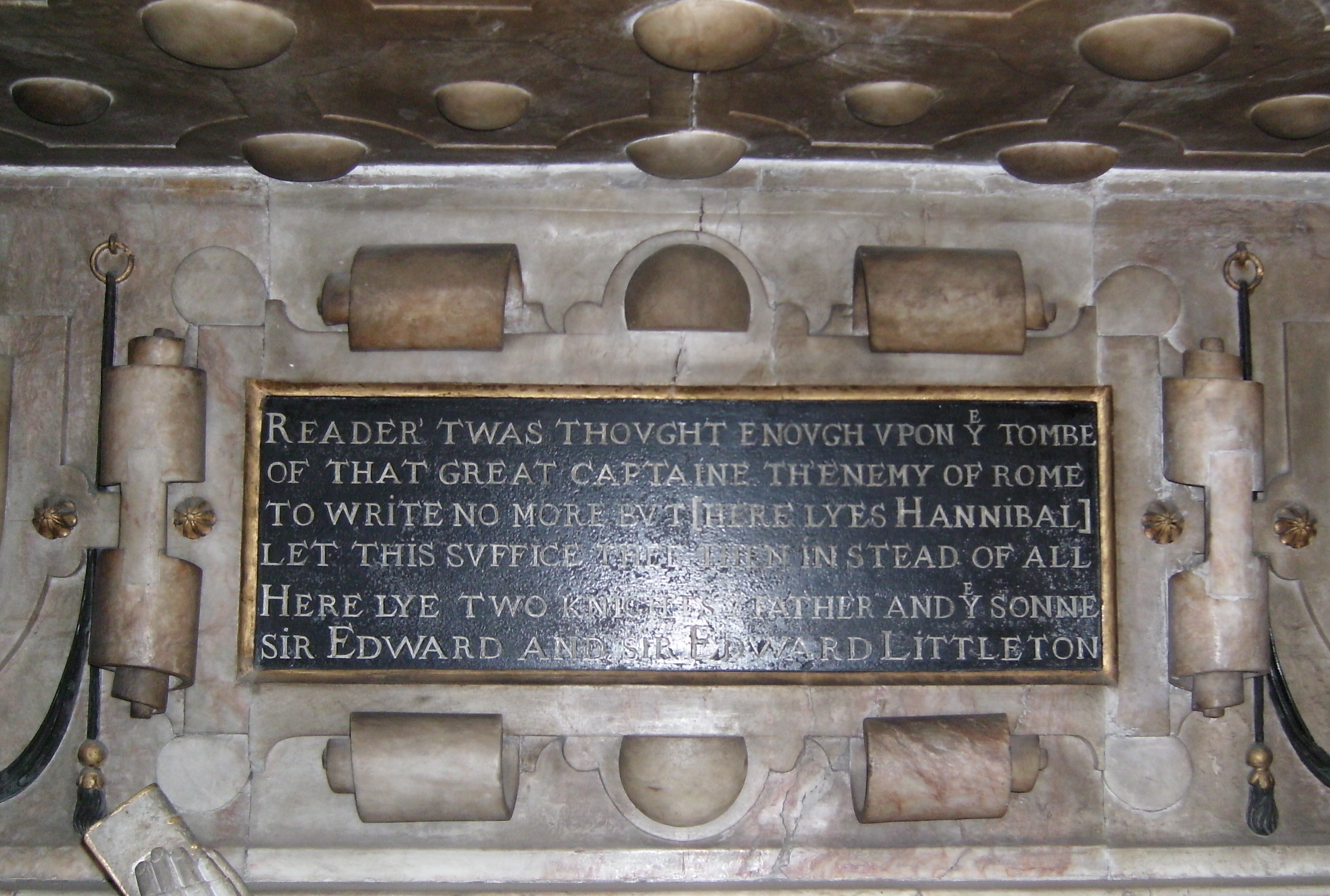
Inscription on the double tomb. Although the import of the inscription is that their reputation is self-evident, it just manages to convey a hint of anti-Catholicism.

== Reformation and revolution: the early modern period ==
=== Dissolution ===
The Reformation brought profound changes to life in Penkridge and its parish. It affected not just the church and religious life, but the entire pattern of ownership and control.

The Suppression of Religious Houses Act 1535 was intended to apply to houses worth less than £200, clear of expenses. This covered the Priory of St. Thomas, near Stafford, which had held the manor of Drayton since 1194. As soon as the act was passed, Rowland Lee, Bishop of Coventry and Lichfield, wrote to his friend Thomas Cromwell, pressing his suit for the priory's lands. The priory housed only the prior himself and five canons but the priory estates were well-managed and brought in about £180 per year – not far short of the threshold, and very much more than most houses covered by the act. As a result, the canons were able to bribe their way out of trouble initially, paying the sum of £133 6s. 8d. for special "toleration and continuance". In 1537 they continued to send money to Cromwell, first £60, then £20, and finally a request to be excused a further £20. This was precisely the excuse Lee needed to accuse them of wasting the priory's resources. He asked that the estates be handed over to him "at an easy rent that the poor boys my nephews may have some relief thereby." The priory was surrendered in October 1538. Lee immediately moved in and bought large parts of the building fabric and livestock for £87. A year later, the rest of the priory property, including Drayton and large estates in Baswich, was granted as a fief to Lee. When he died in 1543, the greater part went to his "poor boys", Brian Fowler and three other nephews. Drayton was thus taken from the church and became lay property. It was to stay with the Fowlers until it was bought by the Littletons in 1790.

The Dissolution of the Monasteries entered a final stage with the Suppression of Religious Houses Act 1539. The manors Bickford, Whiston and Pillaton were technically under the overlordship of Burton Abbey. The abbey had never actually managed the estates, and the manorial lords who occupied them paid small rents for the land. Sir Edward Littleton (died 1558) had his seat at Pillaton Hall, while Bickford and Whiston were held by Sir John Giffard (died 1556) of Chillington Hall, near Brewood. Burton Abbey was surrendered by its monks early in 1539 after an outbreak of Iconoclasm. Overlordship of all three manors passed from the abbey to the Crown, and the Crown later sold it to Sir William Paget a moderate Protestant supporter of the protector Somerset during the minority of Edward VI. Littleton and Giffard both simply transferred payment of their rent to the new overlord and their families continued to prosper throughout the century, the Giffards despite their Catholic Recusancy.

Edward VI's reign brought a more ideological phase of the Reformation, with Somerset and then Northumberland pursuing increasingly radical policies through the boy king. The chantry churches, many of them very wealthy, were despised by Protestants. A movement to abolish them gathered in the final years of Henry VIII and it was at this stage that many chapters tried to make a final profit by selling long leases to secular landlords. Thus it was that St. Michael's leased most of its estates to Sir Edward Littleton of Pillaton Hall and his successors for the very long term of 80 years. However, the abolition movement did not come to fruition in Henry's reign, with only a small number of chantries wound up under the Dissolution of Colleges Act 1545. The Dissolution of Colleges Act 1547, in the new reign, abolished all chantries and their associated colleges.

St. Michael's College was still a thriving institution and its church physically dominated the town as never before. It was during this period that major rebuilding and modifications turned it into the impressive building it is today. The church's estates wholly or partly supported the dean (who was still the current archbishop of Dublin), seven prebendaries, two resident canons who were responsible for the two chantries, an official principal, three vicars choral, three further vicars, a high deacon, a subdeacon, and a sacrist. Most of the lands of the college were leased out to lay magnates – primarily to Edward Littleton, whose leases included the whole of the deanery and the college house, as well as the farm of the prebends of Stretton, Shareshill, Coppenhall and Penkridge. In 1547 the college's property was assessed as worth £82 6s. 8d. annually.

The abolition act dissolved the entire institution of the college. The Chantries Commissioners, who took over the assets, appointed the first Vicar of Penkridge: Thomas Bolt, a priest from Stafford, who was assigned £16 per annum. The former vicar-choral, William Graunger, was made his assistant, on £8. A more distant chapel, in the exclave of Shareshill, was soon also set up as an independent parish church, but those at Coppenhall, Dunston and Stretton were to remain dependent on Penkridge for another three centuries. The college property, still leased and managed in practice by Littleton, was granted by the Crown to John Dudley, Earl of Warwick, a key figure in Edward VI's regency council, and shortly to emerge as the leading man in the land, with the title Duke of Northumberland. Penkridge's history now became closely embedded in that of the monarchy and the course of the Reformation, while Dudley intervened vigorously on the side of Littleton in local property disputes, despite Littleton's religious conservatism. Dudley's local interests paralleled his meteoric national career, which brought him to the heights of power in the realm before a rapid and disastrous fall.

=== The Dudley Inheritance ===
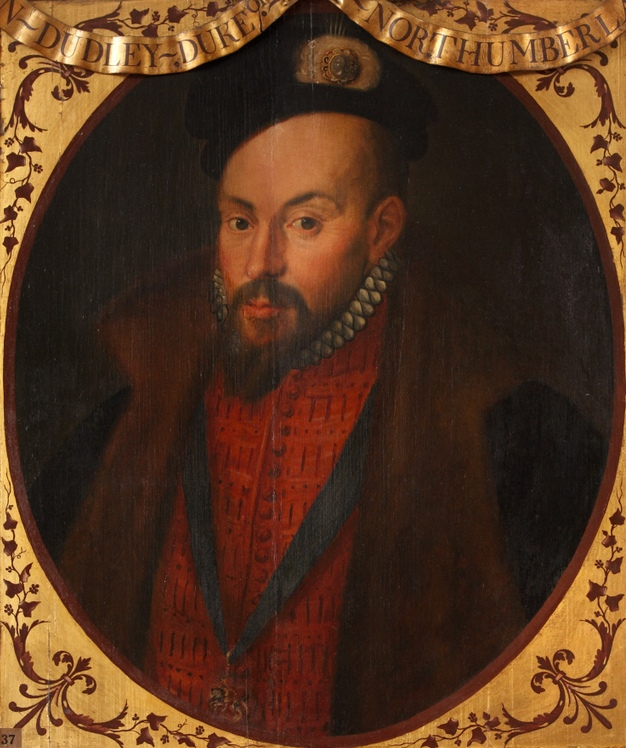
John Dudley, 1st Duke of Northumberland, who briefly held the overlordship of both Penkridge manor and the deanery before his political ambitions led to his execution.

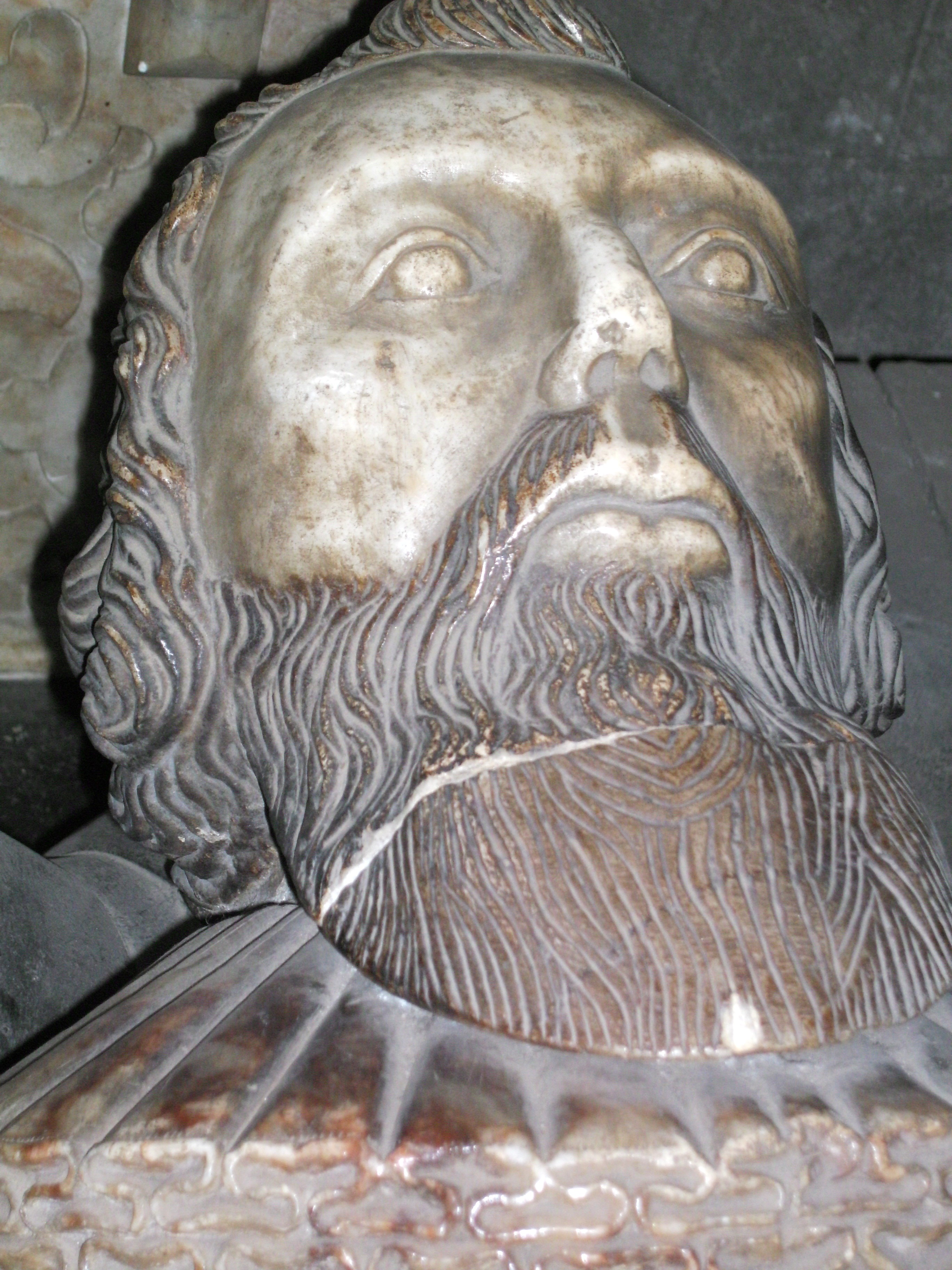
Sir Edward Littleton, who succeeded in 1574 and died in 1610, as portrayed on the double tomb in St. Michael's. His acquisition of the deanery lands in 1585 was a major step towards his family's dominance of the area.

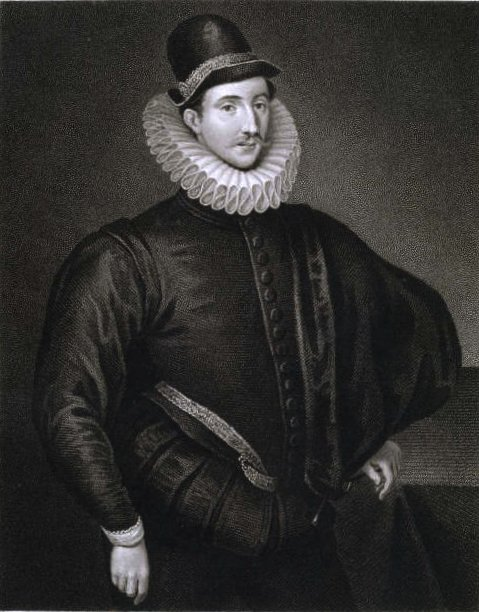
Fulke Greville, 1st Baron Brooke. The Grevilles held the manor of Penkridge for several generations, but also had substantial holdings elsewhere in the Midlands.

Shortly before his acquisition of the College lands, Dudley had also come by the manor of Penkridge. This was the result of a deal made by Robert Willoughby, 2nd Baron Willoughby de Broke, who held the manor of Penkridge at the beginning of the 16th century. In 1507, in need of ready cash, he raised money by mortgaging Penkridge to Edmund Dudley, Henry VII's hated financial agent. In 1510 Dudley was executed by Henry VIII, nominally for treason, but actually, because his extreme unpopularity tarnished the monarchy. In 1519 Willoughby mortgaged the manor to George Monoux, a prominent London businessman. He then passed on the estate through his co-heirs, his granddaughters, Elizabeth and Blanche. The latter died shortly after, and it became the property of Elizabeth and her husband, Fulke Greville. With debts unpaid, Monoux was able to foreclose on the estate. The situation was complicated by the Dudley family's older claim. In 1539, to resolve the situation, Monoux granted the whole manor, no doubt for a consideration, to Edmund Dudley's heir – Robert Dudley, Earl of Warwick. He, in turn, settled it on his son, John Viscount Lisle and his wife, Anne Seymour, Protector Somerset's daughter.

In addition to the Penkridge manor and the church lands, Dudley also acquired large holdings in the wastes to the east and south-east. In 1550 he was granted Teddesley Hay, a large tract to the north-east of Penkridge that was now deforested. Strictly not part of Penkridge, but an extra-parochial area because of its history as part of Cannock Chase, Teddesley Hay was virgin territory, still undrained and uncultivated: as late as 1666, its population liable to hearth tax was counted as just three. At the same time he was granted Gailey Hay, another large area of waste that had been part of the royal forest since King John had taken it from Black Ladies Priory in 1200.

Dudley went on to overthrow Somerset and to have him executed, placing himself in unchallenged power over the young king and the country. When Edward died in 1553, his sister Mary I, a Catholic, was his successor according to both the will of Henry VIII and the Succession to the Crown Act 1543. Dudley attempted a coup d'état to enthrone his Protestant daughter-in-law, Lady Jane Grey. Mary rallied her supporters and marched on London. Dudley was quickly arrested, tried and executed As a traitor, his lands were forfeit to the Crown. This placed in doubt the future of extensive lands at Penkridge and the final resolution took more than thirty years.

The former St. Michael's church estates were all retained by the Crown as overlord. The Crown also retained the advowson of the parish for the time being. Mary's Counter-Reformation was very partial and very parsimonious. The monasteries were not restored and only Wolverhampton was revived among the chapels royal: St. Michael's College had gone, never to return. The deanery house itself was rented out. The lands were leased, mainly to the Littletons. Penkridge manor belonged to the younger John Dudley, who was arrested and condemned to death, like his father. He was reprieved, although he lost Penkridge manor and his other lands to the Crown in 1554, and died shortly after his release from prison. His widow, Anne, was allowed to retain a life interest in Penkridge. She remarried only a year later. When she was declared insane in 1566, her second husband, Sir Edward Unton, took control.

The only quick resolution came with Teddesley Hay. On Dudley's execution, his widow was allowed to retain an interest in it, but she died in 1555. It was sold to the Sir Edward Littleton of Pillaton Hall. The next Sir Edward, who succeeded in 1558, was keen to make something of this wilderness. His vigorous enclosure of the area soon upset neighbouring landowners and their tenants. Gailey Hay also went to Dudley's widow but, after her death, rights and ownership were sold off piecemeal, creating a complex patchwork of competing claims that lingered for three centuries.

Mary's Protestant sister and successor, Elizabeth I (1558–1603), passed through Penkridge in 1575: the visit was without incident. Nothing was done to resolve the situation of the manors of Penkridge. Not until 1581 was the former College property sold to new owners, granted by the Crown to speculators. Edmund Downynge and Peter Aysheton. They sold it on only two years later to John Morley and Thomas Crompton, who also sold it very quickly, in 1585, to Sir Edward Littleton. His family had actually managed the land for decades as lessees and seem to have made a fortune from it. The bulk of the deanery estate was to stay with the Littleton family until the 20th century. With the death of Sir Edward Unton in 1582, Queen Elizabeth gave the reversion of the Penkridge manor to Sir Fulke Greville, son of the Fulke and Elizabeth who had held it in Henry VIII's time. However, Anne Dudley was still alive and could not be dispossessed. Her estates were managed by her son, Edward Unton the younger, until her death in 1588. So it was not until 1590 that Greville came into full possession of the manor.

=== Civil war ===
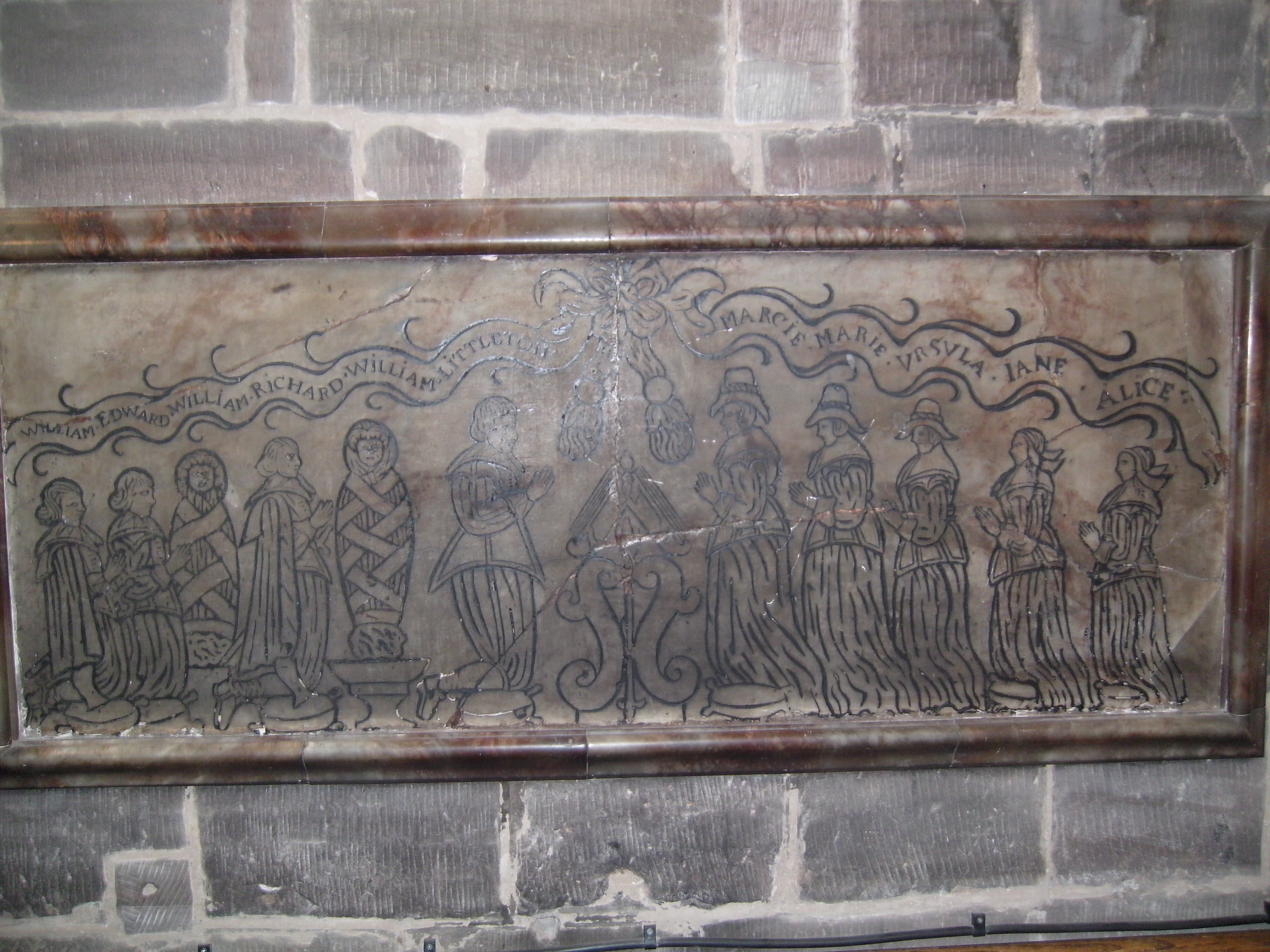
Incised alabaster slab of Littleton family members, in Civil War period dress, now on the north chancel wall of St. Michael's church.

Greville's focus of interest lay in Warwickshire, around Alcester, rather than in Penkridge. On his death in 1606, his estates passed to his son, another Fulke Greville, a poet and statesman who had served Elizabeth well and was to become a mainstay of James I's administration. In 1604 James had presented him with the ruined Warwick Castle, which became his seat, and on which he lavished most of his attention and much of his fortune. In 1621 he was made the 1st Baron Brooke. He held Penkridge until his death in 1628, murdered at Warwick Castle by a servant who resented his treatment in Greville's will. As he was unmarried and childless, he had adopted a younger cousin as his son and heir to the Brooke Barony and most of his estates, including Penkridge manor. This cousin was Robert Greville, 2nd Baron Brooke, an important figure in the parliamentary opposition to Charles I and in the early stages of the English Civil War.

Robert was of pronounced Puritan sympathies. During the 1630s, with Parliament in abeyance, he promoted emigration to America, helping to finance the Saybrook Colony. When civil war broke out in 1642, it was inevitable that he would join the parliamentary army. As a man of considerable organisational ability, he soon emerged as a commanding figure in central England, where loyalties were divided and the course of the war was determined by a patchwork of sieges and skirmishes. After a series of victories in Warwickshire in 1643, he moved his forces to Lichfield, where a royalist force had holed up in the Cathedral. There, while directing his troops, a bullet cut him down. However, the succession to the manor was secure. Robert Greville was succeeded by Francis Greville, 3rd Baron Brooke, and Penkridge manor remained with the Grevilles and their Brooke Barony for another century.

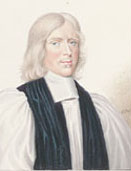
William Lloyd, Bishop of Lichfield and Coventry (1692-9). His bid for control over Penkridge parish was rebuffed by the Littletons.

Despite apparent Puritan sympathies, the Littletons found themselves on the Royalist side. Sir Edward Littleton had been made a baronet by Charles I on 28 June 1627, albeit in exchange for a large sum of money acquired through marriage to Hester Courten, daughter of Sir William Courten, an immensely wealthy London textile merchant and financier. He inherited the estates from his father in 1629 and remained faithful to the king throughout the troubles of the 1630s and 1640s. He was Member of Parliament for Staffordshire from 1640 but was expelled from the House of Commons in 1644. In May 1645, royalist troops were quartered in the village, presumably because of Littleton's known royalist sympathies. A small parliamentary force expelled the royalist soldiers after a brief skirmish. Littleton's estates were subject to sequestration but, like most minor royalist sympathisers, he was able to recover them on payment of a substantial sum: £1347. The family holdings were thus preserved and the family found themselves in favour again after the restoration of Charles II in 1660.

One oddity left by the years of Reformation and revolution was that the peculiar jurisdiction of the old college of Penkridge was not itself abolished. Although the church became the centre of a large Anglican parish, it was still not absorbed into the Diocese of Lichfield. The lord of the manor assumed the role of chief official of the peculiar jurisdiction. After 1585 this was the head of the Littleton family – always named Edward. For a time, in the late 17th century, the archbishops of Dublin claimed the right of canonical visitation – a tenuous claim as their predecessors had been dean, not ordinary, of the church. In the 1690s the diocese of Lichfield and Coventry permission to visit from Narcissus Marsh, archbishop of Dublin. Marsh granted a process to carry out a visitation of Penkridge to Bishop William Lloyd. The process was delivered to the churchwardens of St. Michael's, who immediately involved Sir Edward Littleton, the second baronet, and Littleton wrote in reply to the bishop. William Walmesley, chancellor of the diocese, came to Penkridge to look at the relevant documents and convinced himself that the Archbishop of Dublin had no right of visitation and, consequently, no right to delegate it to anyone else. Bishop Lloyd then called on Littleton to confirm this and had dinner with him. No more was heard of the matter. The Littletons continued to appoint the vicar and to keep the bishop at bay until the peculiar jurisdiction was abolished in 1858.

=== The beginning of enclosure ===
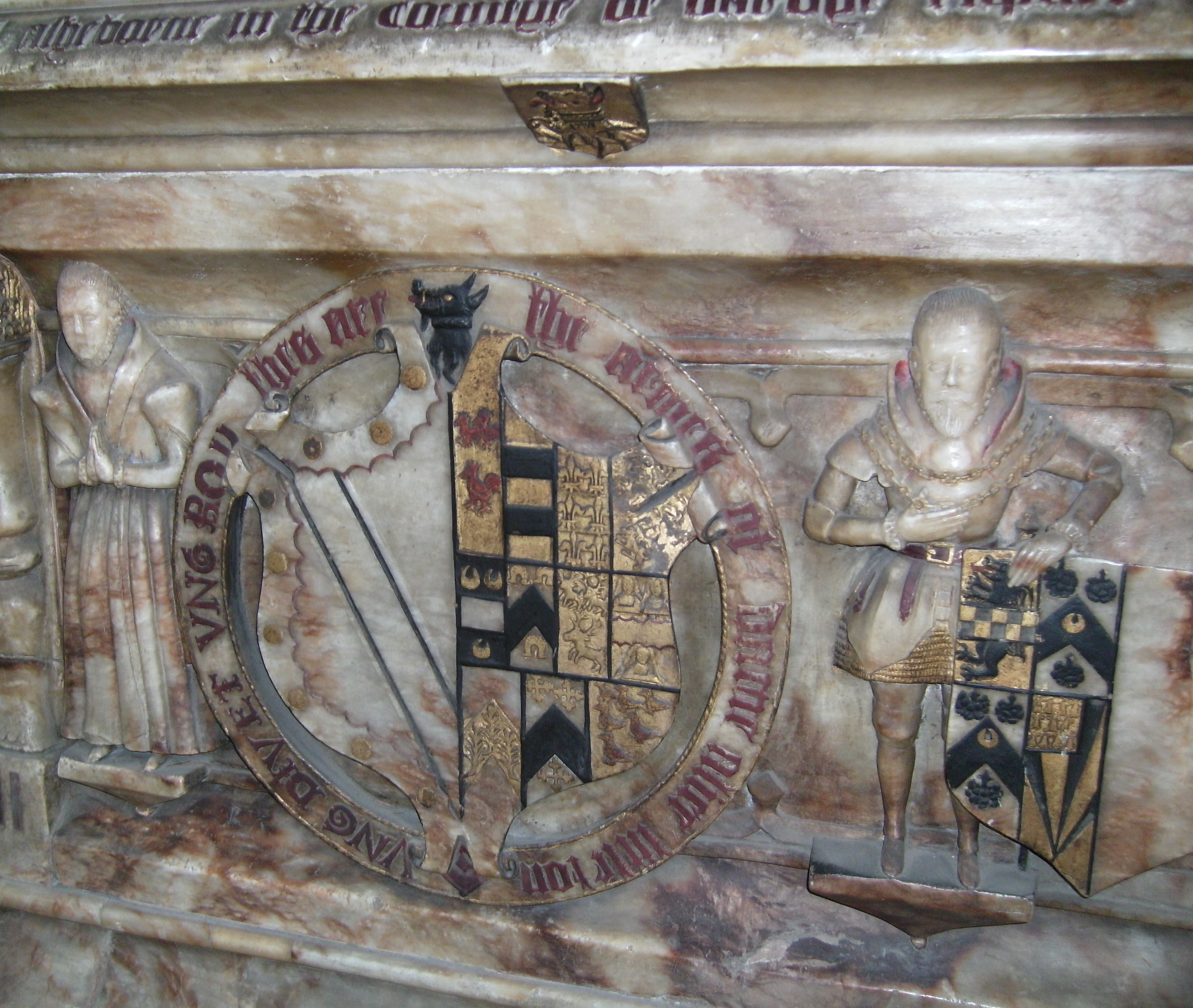
Sir Edward Littleton (head of the family 1558-1574), bearing the Littleton arms, and Alice Cockayne, from their tomb in the chancel. This Sir Edward inherited a large area in Teddesley Hay and upset neighbouring landowners with his enclosure policy.

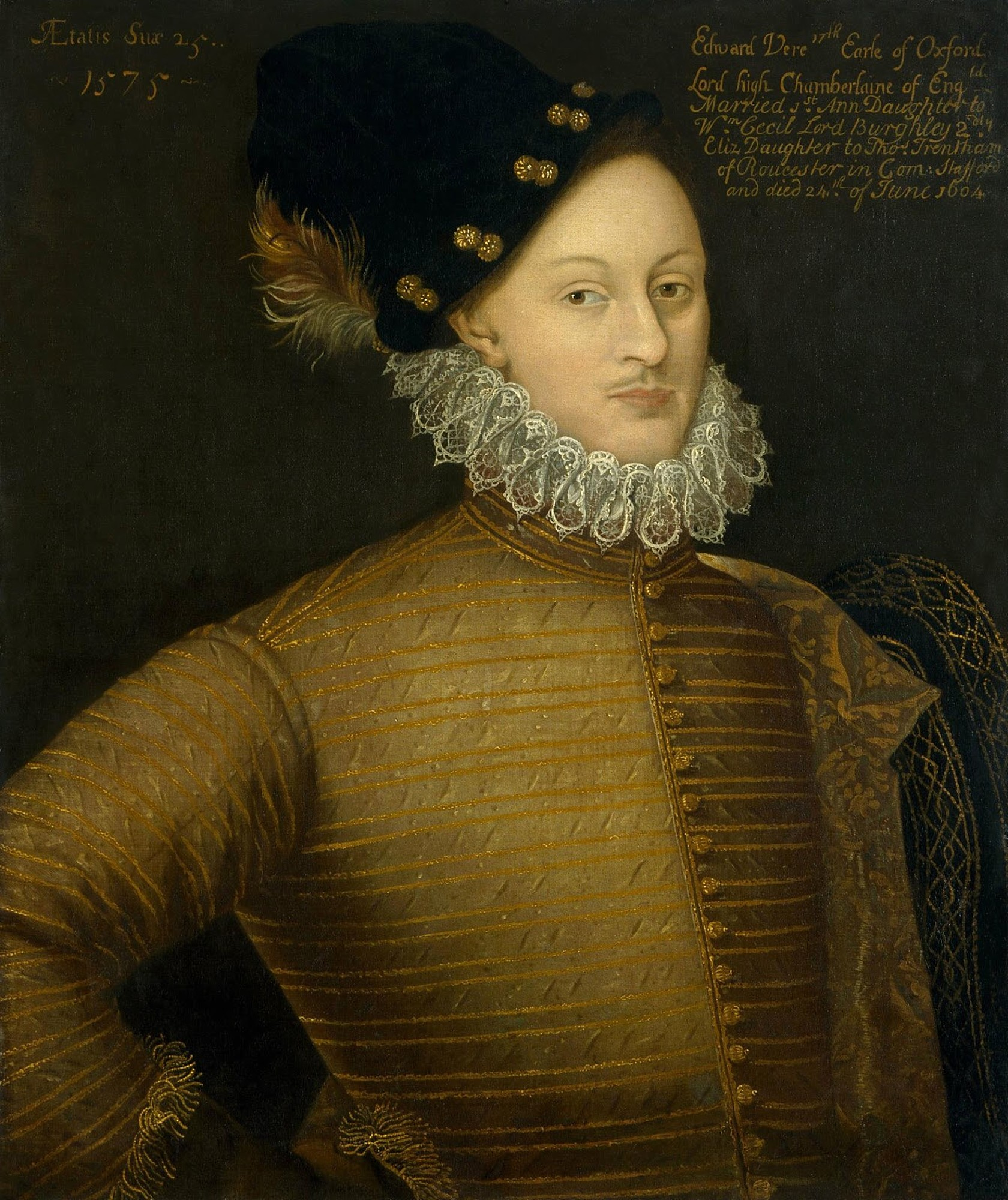
Edward de Vere, 17th Earl of Oxford, clashed with Sir Edward Littleton over enclosures and defended his own tenant's interests vigorously.

Throughout the 16th and 17th centuries enclosure of the open fields, pastures and wastes advanced steadily. It was encouraged by the landowners, who hoped for higher productivity and improved land values. The Littletons were early converts to the cause of enclosure: as early as 1534 enclosures were taking place in the Deanery Manor, which they leased from the church at that time, although the manor was not fully enclosed until the mid-18th century. Enclosure was not always so welcome to occupiers and tenants, who often lost important grazing rights on common land, and who feared their spread of land in the open fields might be replaced by an inferior plot. It could also create tensions between neighbouring landlords.

The Littletons carried out major enclosures in Teddesley Hay in the mid-16th century. This wild area posed far fewer challenges for the encloser than the more densely populated and intensively cultivated areas of Penkridge parish. However, there were still rows with neighbouring landowners and with cultivators who used the resources of the Hay. In 1561 Henry Stafford, 1st Baron Stafford, complained that Sir Edward Littleton (d. 1574) was committing spoils there. In 1569 the Earl of Oxford complained that Littleton's enclosures prevented his tenants in Acton Trussell and Bednall pasturing their animals in the Hay and obstructed their common way to Cannock Wood and Cannock Heath. The Littletons went on to establish a park and coppice in the Hay. In 1675 the people of Penkridge and Bednall demanded that both be thrown open. The struggle was to continue until all common land in the Hay was finally enclosed in 1827.

Enclosure was sometimes welcomed by all parties. In 1617 the common fields of the Littleton's manor of Otherton were enclosed by agreement with the occupiers. In 1662, in Gailey Hay, where the land was divided into 25 parts owned by a number of landowners, the landlords agreed to fence the land to allow the tenants to cultivate it for five years, in return for one seventh of the crop. However, at the end of the 17th century, most of the land in Penkridge and the surrounding manors remained unenclosed, and much of that was still cultivated on the open field system.

== Changing fortunes ==
Penkridge, Staffordshire: Population 1801-1961

Penkridge, Staffordshire: occupational categories of adult males, 1831. From data transcribed by David Allan Gatley (School of Social Sciences, University of Staffordshire).

English: Penkridge, Staffordshire: occupational orders of adult males, 1881. From data edited by Matthew Woollard (History Data Service, UK Data Archive, University of Essex).

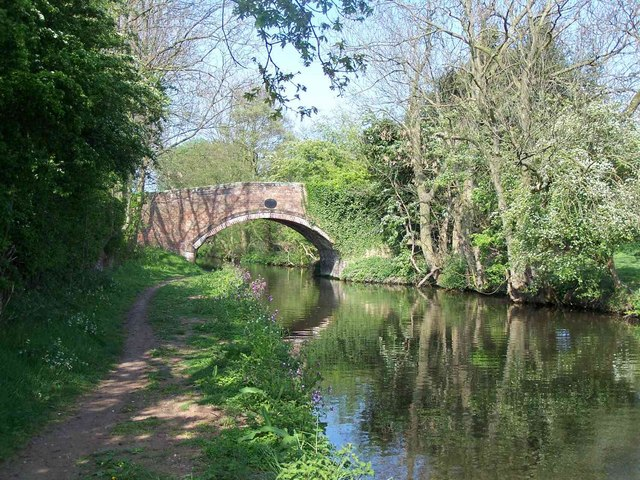
Bridge 88 on the Staffordshire and Worcestershire Canal, north-west of Penkridge.

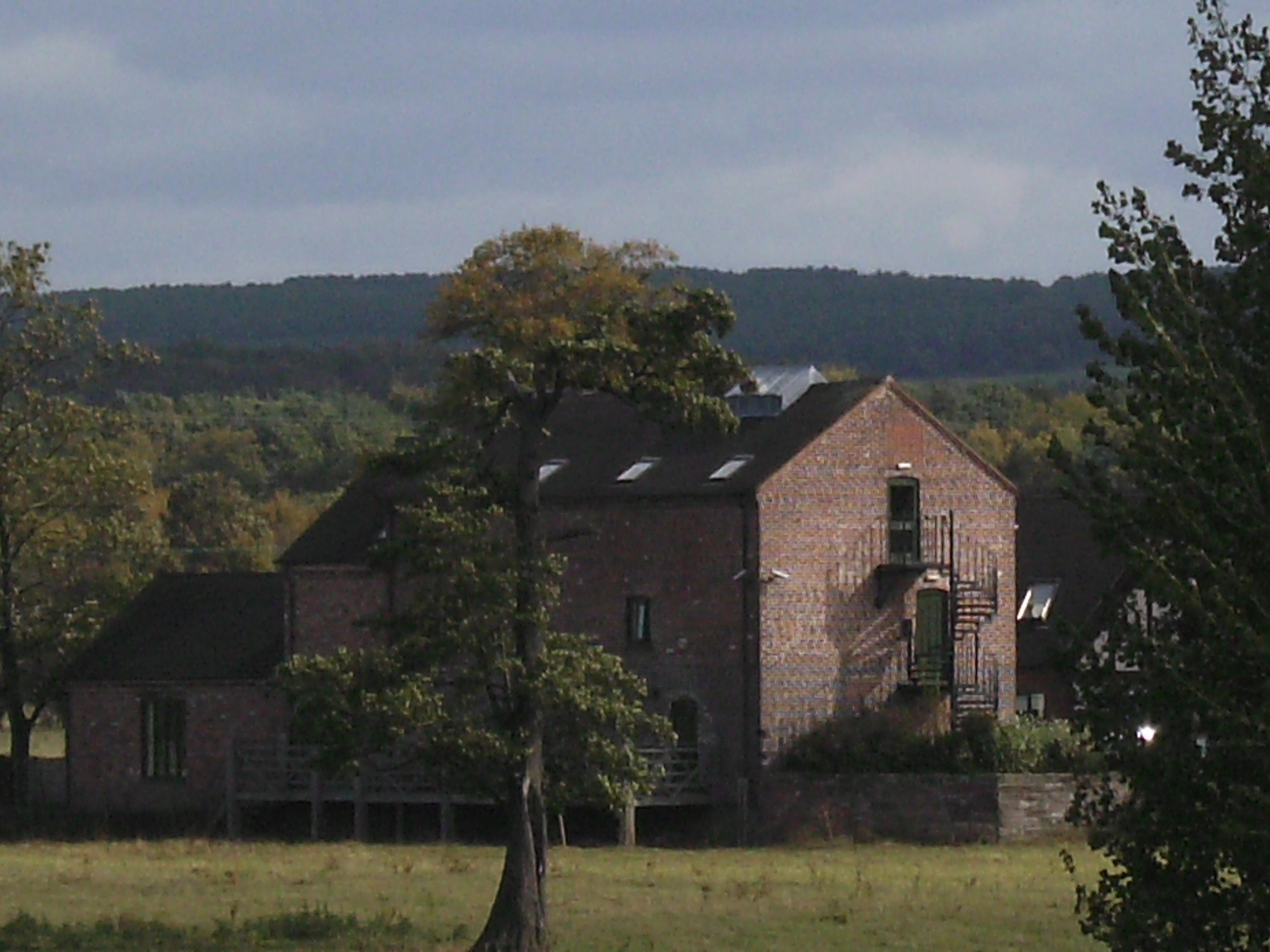
The Roller Mill, used for rolling iron in the early 19th century. Now stranded by alterations to the course of the river, it has been restored to house a local resource centre for Age UK.

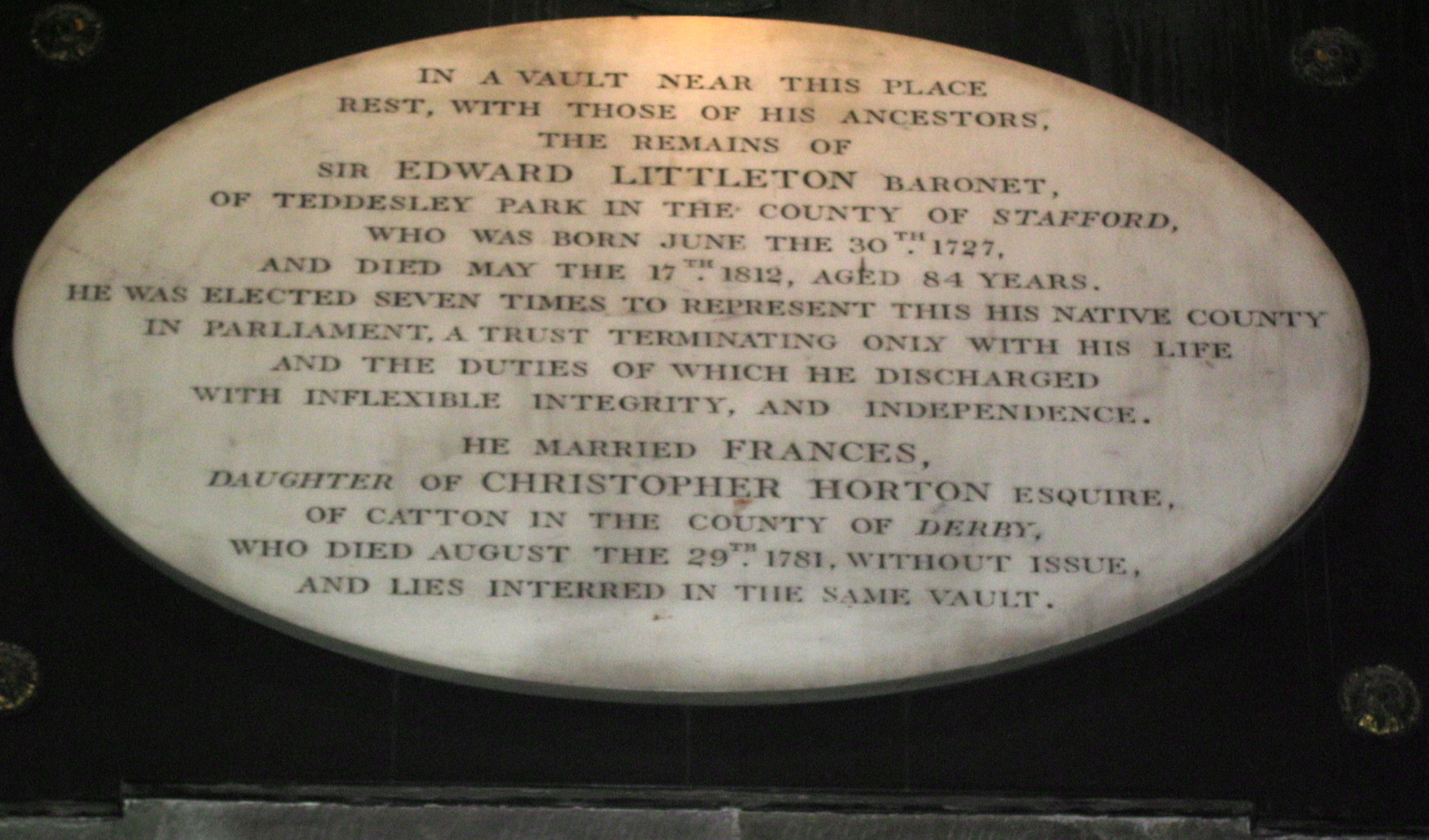
Memorial to Sir Edward Littleton, the 4th and last baronet, who died without issue in 1812, leaving the estates to his great-nephew.

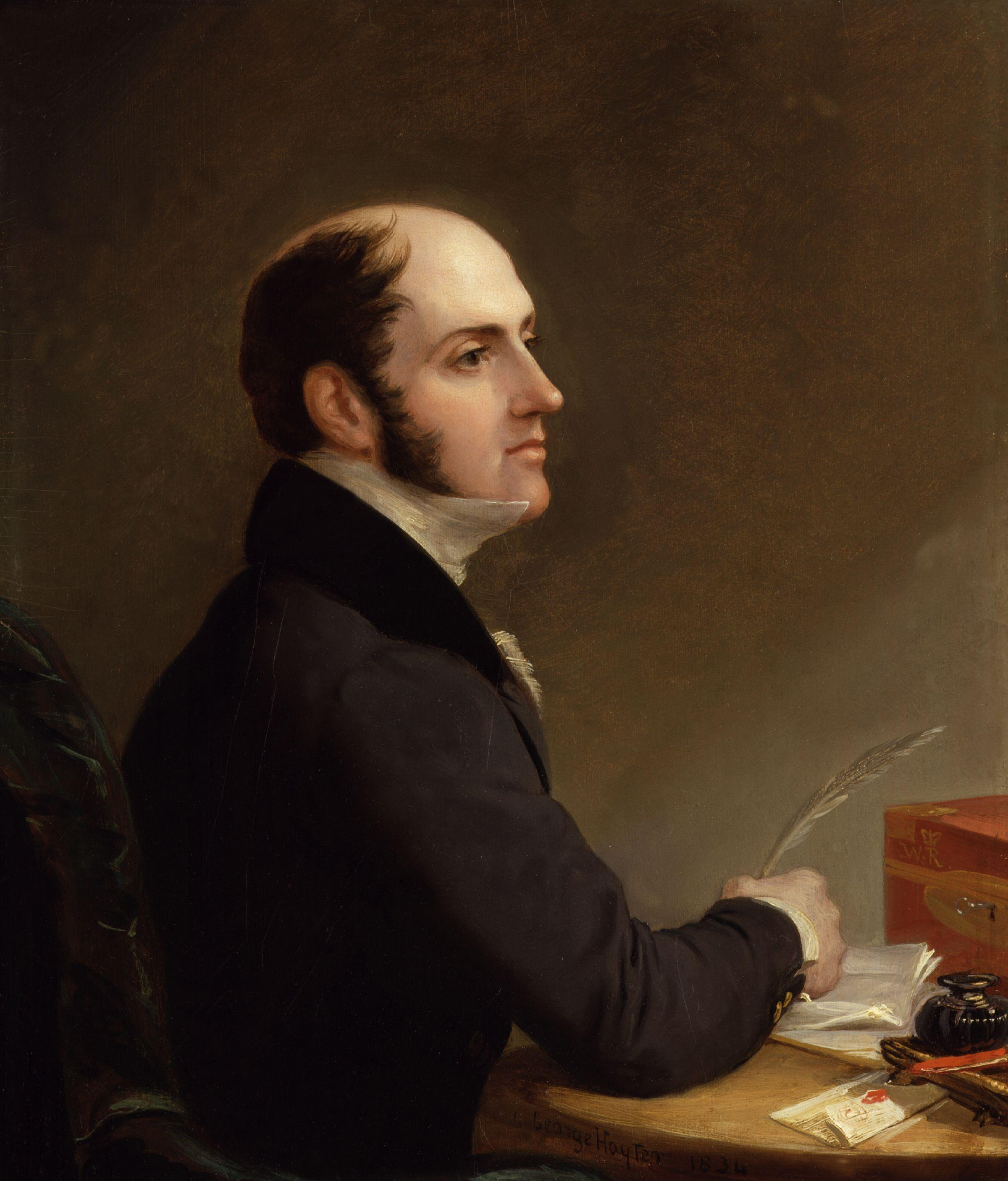
The 1st Baron Hatherton, by Sir George Hayter.

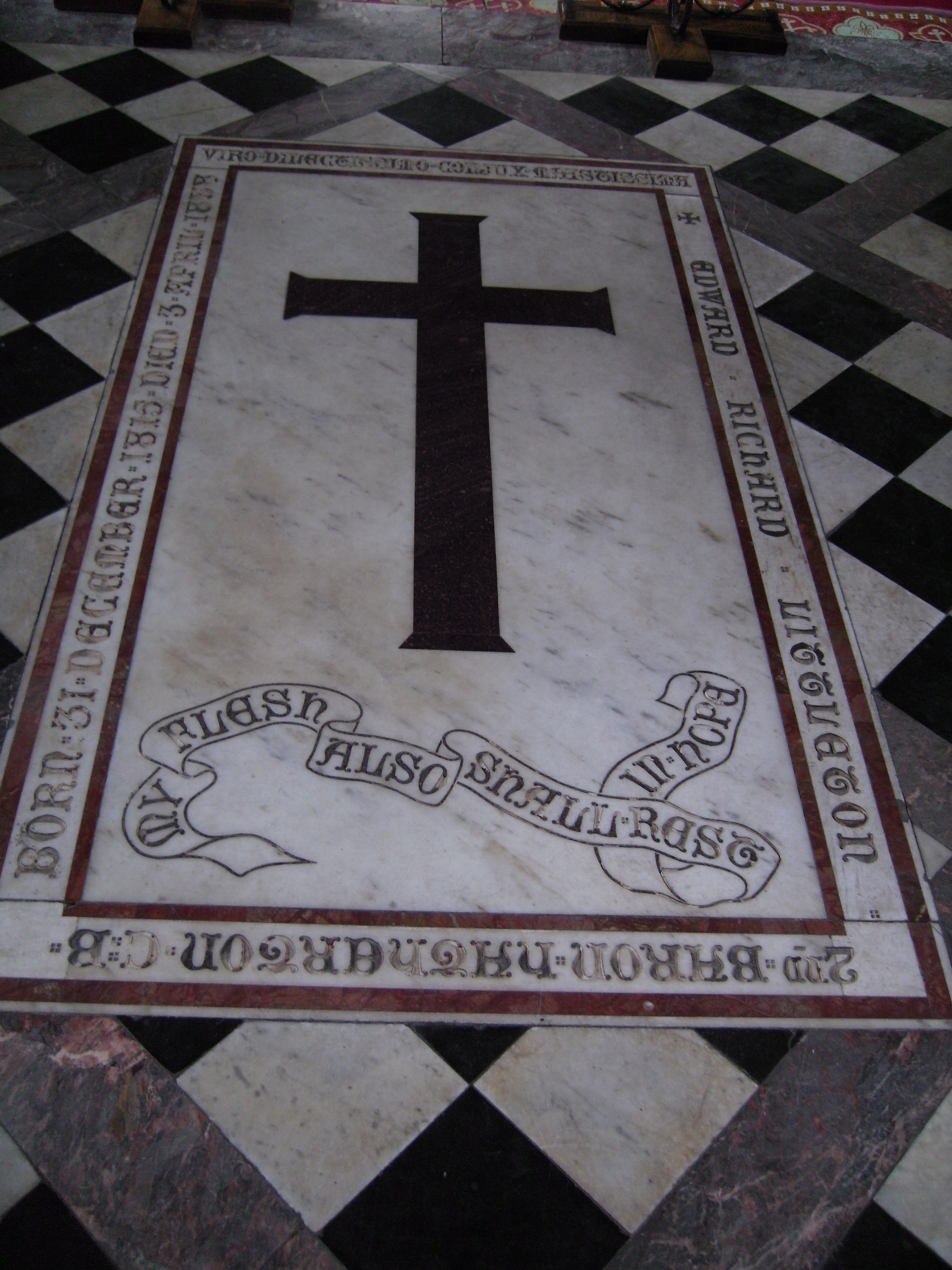
Tomb of Edward Richard Littleton, 2nd Baron Hatherton, who died in 1888, in the chancel of St. Michael's church.

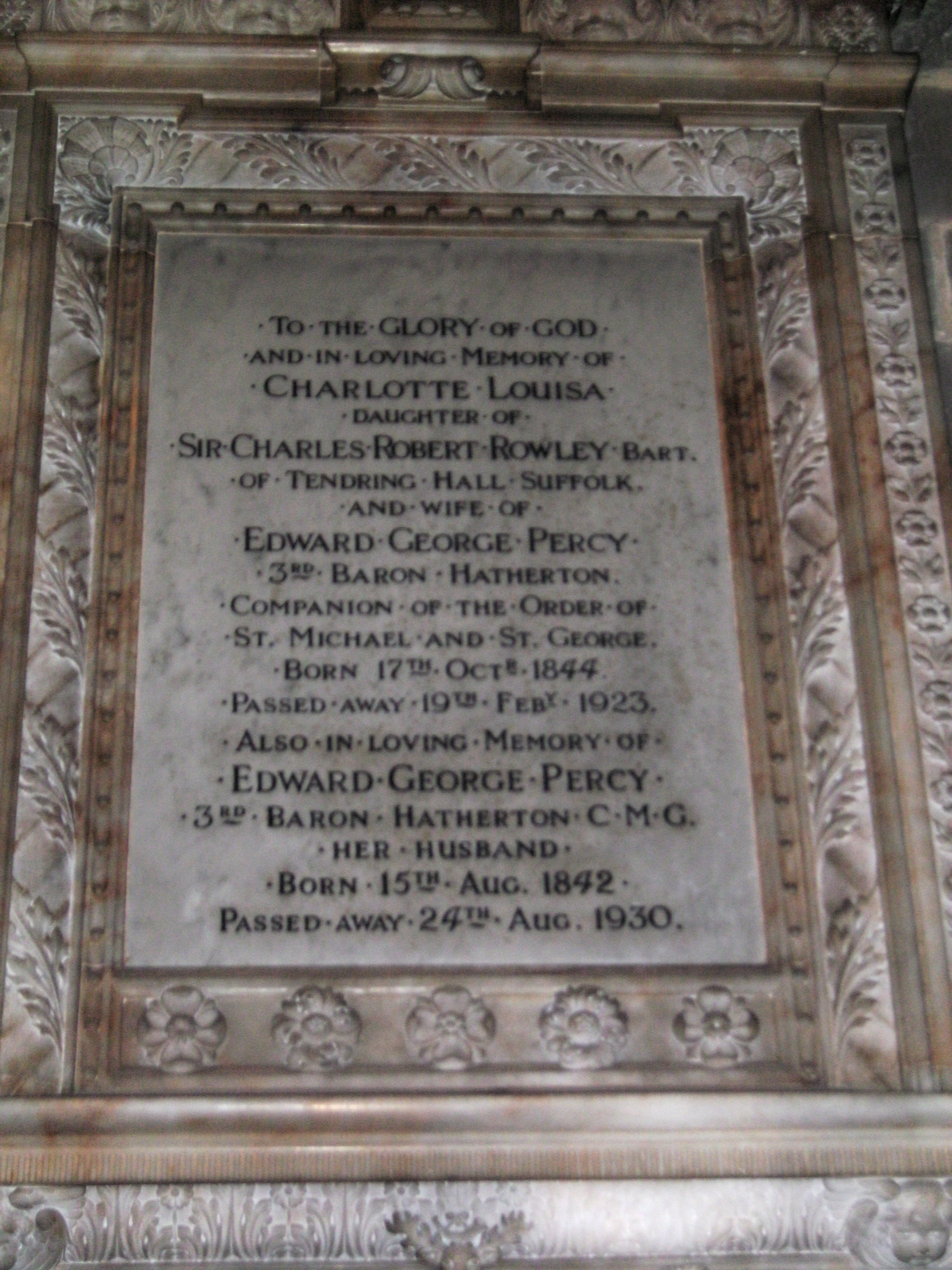
Memorial to the 3rd Baron Hatherton, who began the process of selling off the Littleton estates in 1919.

The 18th and 19th centuries brought vast changes to agriculture and industry, both locally and nationally. After prospering throughout the Georgian period and especially in the Napoleonic Wars, when the Continental System and the Corn Laws together kept grain prices high, agriculture went through a series of crises in Victorian times that hit rural areas hard. However, Penkridge's progress was not entirely typical. The population figures are hard to establish and interpret but seem not simply to show growth followed by sustained decline, as we find, for example, at neighbouring Brewood.

In 1666, the township of Penkridge contained 212 households. The rest of the parish had probably under a hundred households altogether. A population of 1200 to, at most, 1500, seems a reasonable estimate. In 1801, the first census recorded a population of 2,275 – a definite increase – and there were just over two hundred more in 1811. Thereafter the population rose steadily to a peak of 3316 in 1851. The next recorded total, for 1881, shows a considerable drop to 2536. However, this is not strictly comparable. The parish was partitioned in 1866 and the townships of Coppenhall, Dunston, and Stretton were made into separate parishes. Their total population in 1881 numbered nearly 600 and all three were at that time in decline. Penkridge itself seems to have had a fairly stable population for the century from 1851 to 1951. Of course, the population of the country as a whole rose rapidly in this period, so Penkridge's was in relative decline, and there must have been a drift to the towns, but the town did not suffer the collapse endured by nearby settlements.

Agriculture continued to be the most important employer of labour throughout the Victorian period, although it did decline to some extent and it was never totally dominant. The 1831 census collected male employment data at the parish level. It shows 894 adult males in work. Of these, 90 were farmers and 394 agricultural labourers, so agriculture directly employed almost exactly 60% of the men. The next largest category is those in retail and handicrafts, which accounts for 175. This significant number reflects Penkridge's continuing importance as a commercial centre. These men would be largely inhabitants of the town, while the agriculturalists would be much more widely dispersed throughout the parish. Although the market had been discontinued, the town must have teemed with small shops and workshops.

Not until fifty years later do we get parish-level employment data, this time including women, but not directly comparable. 305 of the 638 working men are accounted for by agriculture – about 48%: a considerable, if not precipitous drop. The great majority of the women are shown as status unknown or not in a specified employment. Of those who are employed, 150, the vast majority, are in domestic service. These actually form the largest single group of employees after the agriculturalists, and probably found work with many middle-class families as well as with the gentry. The hospitality industry seems to have been quite important: forty men are shown as working in food and lodging – a significant number, although not surprising on a major route. Oddly only one woman is listed in the same trade: almost certainly many women worked part-time or in family concerns, without showing up in the figures. A good proportion of the 15 men working with carriages and horses probably serviced the inn customers too. The diversity of trades is marked. No less than 43 – 25 women and 18 men – were involved in dress-making, an important part of any retail centre at the time. There were quarrymen, traders, and many others. However, professionals are numbered at only 14. Most of these must have been associated with the church and the gentry estates: although a lively shopping centre, Penkridge did not have the numbers of lawyers and executives characteristic of the county towns and larger market towns.

Penkridge owed much to its transport links, which were always good, but steadily improved. The main Stafford-Wolverhampton route, now the A449 road was turnpiked under the Stafford, Worcester and Warwick Roads Act 1760 (1 Geo. 3. c. 39): there was a toll gate just north of the Rodbaston turning. Bull Bridge, which carries the road over the Penk, was rebuilt in 1796 and widened in 1822. The improved road quickly attracted traffic, with stops at Penkridge from coaches on the London - Manchester, Birmingham - Manchester, and Birmingham - Liverpool routes by 1818.

New forms of transport had an even more profound impact. The Staffordshire and Worcestershire Canal, designed by James Brindley, opened in 1772, running straight through the parish and the township from north to south, and crossed by 15 bridges. There was an important wharf at Spread Eagle (named after a pub on Watling Street and later called Gailey) and another was later built at Penkridge itself. By the 1830s boats were calling several times daily, linking Penkridge to a waterway network that extended across almost the whole country. In 1837, the Grand Junction Railway was opened, carried over the River Penk by the fine seven-arched Penkridge Viaduct, designed by Joseph Locke and built by Thomas Brassey. It cut through Penkridge on its west side, along the edge of the church yard, where the station was built. Like the canal, the railway also had a stop at Spread Eagle (although Gailey station has since closed), and it began with two trains daily in each direction, to Stafford and Wolverhampton. The canal and railway carried both finished goods and raw materials as well as passengers, and must have played a major part in the town's prosperity.

In the early stages of the industrial revolution, iron working along the Penk and its tributaries received a stimulus, making iron the town's main industry for a time. As early as 1590 Edward Littleton (d. 1610) was looking for a suitable place for a furnace and there was an iron foundry at Penkridge by 1635. In the early 18th century, a forge at Congreve was turning out 120 tons a year, and in the 1820s the mill below Bull Bridge was used for rolling iron. However, this industry tailed off as the Black Country ironworks outstripped it in output and beat it on price. Thereafter, extractive industries came to the fore. By the mid-19th century, the Littletons were operating quarries at Wolgarston, Wood Bank, and Quarry Heath, as well as a sand pit at Hungry Hill, Teddesley, and a brickyard in Penkridge.

The fortunes of the town and the Littletons remained intertwined throughout the Georgian and Victorian ages. Sir Edward Littleton, 4th Baronet, who succeeded in 1742, completed his family's dominance of the parish by buying Penkridge manor from the Earl of Warwick in 1749. He soon began work on a new and more impressive seat for the family: Teddesley Hall, north-west of Penkridge, on Teddesley Hay. This was built on the site of Teddesley Lodge, a smaller house that had earlier accommodated junior members of the Littleton family. It was said that the finance came from large hoards of coins discovered behind panels at Pillaton Hall, which raised the vast sum of £15,000 on sale. The new house was large but austere, a three-storied, square, brick structure, with seven windows on the upper storeys on all four faces. The main building was linked by curved screen walls to flanking ranges, one housing stables, the other kitchens, stores and servants' rooms.

The fourth baronet was long-lived, surviving until 1812, although, his wife, Frances Horton, died childless in 1781. In his later life, he represented Staffordshire in Parliament, siding with the Whigs, who were mainly in opposition during that period, and achieving some distinction, but he never remarried. However, he did secure the succession by adopting his great-nephew, Edward Walhouse, as his heir. Walhouse took the name Littleton and inherited the Littleton estates, although not the Littleton baronetcy. He also took on his great-uncle's constituency, and he was to achieve far greater eminence as a politician than any previous or subsequent member of the family. Joining the liberal Canningite wing of the Tory party, he campaigned prominently for Catholic Emancipation. When George Canning died in 1827, Littleton went over to the Whigs. He was appointed Chief Secretary for Ireland by the Whig Prime Minister Grey in 1833. Ultimately he was to find that he could not sacrifice his principles for political gain: having made promises he could not keep to the Irish leader, Daniel O'Connell, he resigned his post. However, he was elevated to the peerage as Baron Hatherton, a title which remains with the head of the Littleton family to the present. Hatherton married Hyacinthe Mary Wellesley, illegitimate daughter of Richard Wellesley, 1st Marquess Wellesley, and thus a niece of the Iron Duke. After a long life, he left an heir: Edward Littleton, 2nd Baron Hatherton, another Liberal politician.

However, even the title of the baronage makes clear that the Littleton family now had holdings and interests far wider than Penkridge. Hatherton was historically an exclave of Wolverhampton, but became a separate parish in the mid-19th century. The Littletons had a house there as well as land, but they owned a great deal more in Cannock, Walsall and other parts of Staffordshire. In fact, the first baron had brought about a decisive shift in the family's economic activities. As the heir to a large fortune from the Walhouse family and a successful businessman himself, he had large land and mineral holdings in the Cannock and Walsall areas. The Littleton estates were a part, albeit an important part, of a wider portfolio. The National Archives list the following property interests of the 1st Baron Hatherton in 1862, a year before his death:

- Teddesley Hall, Woods and Farm; Hatherton Hall, Pillaton Gardens, Teddesley and Hatherton Estate Rentals - all in his own occupation
- 288 holdings in the following townships: Abbots Bromley, Acton Trussell, Bednall, Beaudesert and Longdon, Bosoomoor, Congreve, Coppenhall, Cannock, Drayton, Dunston, Huntington, Hatherton, Linell, Levedale, Longridge, Otherton, Pipe Ridware, Penkridge, Pillaton, Preston, Stretton, Saredon and Shareshill, Teddesley, Water Eaton, Wolgarston, Walsall Estate Rental
- 236 holdings, in Walsall
- Royalties from mineral extraction at Hatherton Colliery, Bloxwich; Hatherton Colliery, Great Wyrley; Serjeants Hill Colliery, Walsall; Hatherton Lime Works, Walsall; Walsall Old Lime Works; Paddock Brickyard, Walsall; Sutton Road Brickyard, Walsall; Serjeants Hill Brickyard, Walsall; Butts Brickyard, Walsall; Old Brooks Brickyard, Walsall; Long House Brickyard, Cannock; Rumer Hill Brickyard, Cannock; Penkridge Brickyard; Wolgarstone Stone Quarry, Teddesley; Wood Bank and Quarry Heath Stone Quarries, Teddesley; Gravel Pit, Huntington; Sand Pit at Hungry Hill, Teddesley.
- Tithes from 579 occupiers in Hatherton, Cannock, Leacroft, Hednesford, Cannock Wood, Wyrley, Saredon, Shareshill, Penkridge, Congreve, Mitton, Whiston, Rodbaston, Coppenhall, Dunston, Bloxwich, Walsall Wood.

This is a formidable list and it shows clearly that the Littleton's concerns were tipping towards their profitable mining and quarrying interests, mainly, if not entirely, outside Penkridge, although in nearby towns and villages. The occupational data in the 1881 census, which show agriculture still dominant in Penkridge, also show mining even more dominant in neighbouring Cannock, with 2881 men and 17 women mine and quarry workers – the majority employed in Lord Hatherton's enterprises. Not surprisingly, Cannock's entire history contrasts strongly with its neighbours in Staffordshire. While Penkridge changed to remain stable, and Brewood declined markedly, Cannock grew very rapidly from about the middle of the 19th century. Cannock parish's population in 1851 was 3,081 – a little less than Penkridge's. By 1881, it had risen to an astonishing 17,125. Cannock was a boom town of the early Victorian period, driven forward by the voracious demand of the industrial economy for coal. Walsall was a fast-growing manufacturing centre, with money to be made from industrial property and workers' housing: it was here that the second Baron Hatherton made one of the family's largest benefactions, Walsall Arboretum, site of the former lime quarry, and where two main roads are called Littleton Street and Hatherton Street. Significantly Edward Littleton, later to become the 2nd Baron, pursued his political career as MP for the new Walsall constituency. The Littletons played a leading part in this phase of the Industrial Revolution and made large profits from it, and this tilted their attention increasingly away from their landed estates.

Meanwhile, agriculture remained in the doldrums, with the Long Depression of the late Victorian period driving down farm incomes and rents and hastening migration to the industrial towns. The 20th century brought little relief, with only the World Wars giving temporary boosts to agriculture. The land tax proposals of the People's Budget of 1909 were dropped, but it was a warning to large landowners what was to come. Not surprisingly, those who were able to do so got out of land. In 1919, the 3rd Lord Hatherton disposed of large estates in the Penkridge area: over 360 acres (1.5 km^{2}) of the deanery estate; Congreve House and 146 acres (0.59 km^{2}) in Congreve (probably former prebendal property); 368 acres (1.49 km^{2}) in Lower Drayton; 312 acres (1.26 km^{2}) in Upper Drayton; 250 acres (1.0 km^{2}) in Gailey, including the Spread Eagle Inn; 500 acres (2.0 km^{2}) in Levedale; and 340 acres (1.4 km^{2}) in Longridge. In many cases, farms were sold to their tenants. The nationalisation of the coal industry in 1946 severed the main link between the family and the area. In 1947 the 4th Lord Hatherton sold some of the land at Teddesley Hay. In 1953, he completed the process, selling over 1,520 acres (6.2 km^{2}) at Penkridge and 2,976 in Teddesley Hay, including Teddesley Hall, the family seat. The long dominance not only of the Littleton family, but of the landed gentry as a class, had finally come to an end.

== The modern village ==
Penkridge in the 20th and 21st centuries has followed a double track, on the one hand evolving into a residential centre, like many fringing the West Midlands conurbation, on the other remaining a market village and commercial centre of considerable importance.

The residential evolution began shortly after the coming of the railway, with the development of the St. Michael's Road area on the western edge of Penkridge: large Victorian houses with large gardens, accommodating middle-class families which probably earned a living in Stafford, Wolverhampton or even Birmingham The main Stafford-Wolverhampton road was greatly improved between the wars, with large parts turned into a dual carriageway. The impact was felt first at Gailey, where two stages of widening in 1929 and 1937 took out parts of the churchyard and resulted in the demolition of the original Spread Eagle Inn. The widening work between 1932 and 1934 brought a major reshaping of Penkridge itself. Early-19th-century coachmen considered the Penkridge section the most difficult between London and Liverpool because of its narrowness. The widening swept away up to 30 houses, many of them medieval, on the east side of Clay Street, together with the old George and Fox Inn and a square called Stone Cross on its west side. Initially, this was most important for the improved flow of commercial traffic: after World War II, with greatly increased availability and use of motor cars, it made Penkridge much more viable as a home for workers employed in the conurbation or the county town.

The war itself brought further changes. The old common lands between the Penk and the Cannock Road were used as a military camp during the war years. This eased their subsequent development as a large housing estate, greatly enlarging the size and population of Penkridge in the 1950s and 1960s. Between 1951 and 1961 the population grew from 2,518 to 3,383 – a rise of over 34% in just ten years.

Improvements in communications continued to drive the economy of the village. The M6 motorway came around Stafford in 1962, running north–south between Penkridge and Wolgarston. More importantly, there were junctions just north of Penkridge, at Dunston, and south-east, near Gailey. This gave the village much faster access to the conurbation beyond Wolverhampton, as well as to Stoke-on-Trent, Manchester and the north. The M6 linked to the M1 motorway in 1971 and the long-awaited M54 motorway, shadowing the ancient Watling Street opened in 1983, greatly improving links with Telford, Shrewsbury and much of Wales. Penkridge was now very favourably placed on a truly national motorway network. Since the arrival of the M6, the population has more than doubled, as new houses have spread along all the roads, particularly north and south along the A449.

Penkridge has remained a substantial commercial and shopping centre. The major supermarket chains have not been allowed to open stores in the town and its only large store is a Co-operative supermarket. Independent shops, cafés, inns and services occupy the area between the old market place to the east and Stone Cross on the A449 to the west. The area between Pinfold Lane and the river, long the site of livestock sales, has emerged as a new market place, attracting large numbers of visitors to Penkridge on market days.
