= Elan =

Elan or Élan may refer to:

== Arts and entertainment ==
=== Fictional characters ===
- Elan (Order of the Stick), in the webcomic The Order of the Stick
- Elan (Dungeons & Dragons), a race in Dungeons & Dragons
- Elan (Star Wars Legends), a Star Wars character

=== Music ===
- Elán (band), a Slovak pop rock band
- "Élan" (song), by Nightwish, 2015
- Élan (Firefall album), 1978
- Elan (Mari Hamada album), 2005

=== Literature ===
- Elan (magazine), an online lifestyle publication

== Business and organisations ==
- Elan (company), a Slovenian sports equipment company
- Élan, an Irish pharmaceutical company
- Elan Financial Services, a subsidiary of U.S. Bancorp
- Élan Motorsport Technologies, an American race car manufacturing consortium
- ELAN Microelectronics, a Taiwanese manufacturer of microcontrollers
- Élan School, a behavior modification program in Poland, Maine
- Elanco, NYSE stock ticker

== People ==
- Elán (musician) (born 1983), Mexican singer
- Elan Atias (born 1975), American singer-songwriter
- Elan Carr (born 1968), American attorney and politician
- Elan Closs Stephens (born 1948), Welsh academic
- Elan Daley (born 2005), Bermudian swimmer
- Elan Gale (born 1983), American author
- Elan Lee, American game designer
- Elan Lee Buller (born 1979), American basketball player
- Elan Mastai, Canadian screenwriter and novelist
- Elan Portnoy, American musician
- Elan Sicroff (born 1950), American pianist
- Elan (director), Indian film director

== Places ==
- Élan, Ardennes, France
- Elan, Bichursky District, Republic of Buryatia, Russia
- Elan Valley, Wales
  - Elan Village
- Afon Elan, a river in Wales
- Elan (Prut), a river in Romania
- Élan School, an abusive behavioral correction facility that shut down in 2011

== Science and technology ==
=== Computing and software ===
- AMD Élan, a microchip
- Elan, another name for the 1980s Enterprise home computer
- Elan Graphics, computer graphics architecture
- ELAN (programming language)
- ELAN software, for transcription and annotation

=== Medicine ===
- Early left anterior negativity, an event-related potential in electrophysiology

== Other uses ==
- Greek People's Liberation Navy (Ελληνικό Λαϊκό Απελευθερωτικό Ναυτικό), commonly abbreviated as ELAN
- Lotus Elan, a car model, and later variant Kia Elan
- Elan (snowmobile), by Skidoo
- French sloop Élan, a minesweeping vessel
- Elan Sportif, a Beninese basketball club

== See also ==
- Elan Vital (disambiguation)
- Elaan (disambiguation)
- Eland (disambiguation)
- Elam (disambiguation)
- Ilan (disambiguation)
- Poets of Elan, a group of Ecuadorian poets
