= Eland =

Eland or Elands may refer to:

== Animals ==
- Taurotragus, large African antelopes
  - Common eland, of East and Southern Africa
  - Giant eland, of Central and West Africa

== Places ==
- Elands, New South Wales, Australia
- Eland, Wisconsin, United States
- Elland, West Yorkshire, England (formerly Eland)
- Eland House, London, England
- Eland Mountains, Antarctica

== Businesses ==
- Eland Books, a publishing house
- Eland Oil & Gas, a Nigeria-focused upstream oil and natural gas exploration and production company
- E-Land Group, a South Korean conglomerate

== Military ==
- Operation Eland, a 1976 attack by Rhodesian Selous Scouts at Nyadzonya, Mozambique
- Eland Mk7, a South African armoured car

== Other uses ==
- Eland (surname)
- Napier Eland, a type of turboshaft

== See also ==
- Elan (disambiguation)
- Elaan (disambiguation)
