= Ilan =

Ilan may refer to:

- Ilan (name), a Hebrew given name and surname; contains a list of people with the name
- ILAN, Israeli umbrella organization for the treatment of disabled children

== Places ==
- Neve Ilan, a moshav shitufi in central Israel, west of Jerusalem
- Ilan (county) (Yilan), a county in Taiwan
- Ilan (city) (Yilan), capital of the county of Ilan (Yilan) in Taiwan
- Ilan, Fars, a village in Iran
- Ilan, Qazvin, a village in Iran

== See also ==
- Yilan (disambiguation)
- Llan (disambiguation)
- Elan (disambiguation)
- Elaan (disambiguation)
