= Ilam =

Ilam may refer to:

== Places ==
- Ilam District, Province No. 1, Nepal
  - Ilam Municipality, in the Ilam District, Nepal
- Ilam province, Region 4, Iran
  - Ilam County, Ilam Province
    - Ilam, Iran, capital city of Ilam Province and Ilam County
    - Ilam Airport, serving the city
  - Ilam University Farm, a village in Mehran County, Ilam Province
- Ilam, New Zealand, a suburb of Christchurch
  - Ilam (New Zealand electorate), a parliamentary electorate
  - Ilam School of Fine Arts, University of Canterbury, Ilam
- Ilam, Staffordshire, a village in England
  - Ilam Park, a National Trust property in Ilam, Staffordshire
- Ilam or Eelam, Tamil name for Sri Lanka

== Other uses ==
- Independent Lawyers' Association of Myanmar
- Instituto Latinoamericano de Museos, web portal about Latin American museums and parks
- International Library of African Music, based in South Africa

== See also ==
- Elam (disambiguation)
