= Elam (disambiguation) =

Elam was an ancient civilization in what is now southwest Iran.

Elam or ELAM may also refer to:

- Elam (surname)
- Elam, Dallas, a settlement in the United States
- Elam, son of Shem, a biblical character
- ELAM (Cyprus), a political party in Cyprus, part of the European Parliament
- Latin American School of Medicine (Escuela Latinoamericana de Medicina), Cuba
- Elam School of Fine Arts, University of Auckland, New Zealand
- East London Arts & Music, a sixth form school in East London, England
- Early Launch Anti-Malware, a Windows 8 feature
- ELAM 10 Rafael Ferro Macias, faculty of the Cuban hospital

== See also ==
- Elan (disambiguation)
- Ilam (disambiguation)
- Eelam, Tamil name for Sri Lanka
- E-selectin, also known as endothelial-leukocyte adhesion molecule 1 (ELAM-1)
