= Robert Sann Aung =

Burmese human rights lawyer

- ရောဘတ်ဆန်းအောင်
- Born: c. 1954 (age 71–72); Burma (now Myanmar)
- Occupation: Lawyer
- Years active: 1982-present
- Known for: Human rights

Robert Sann Aung (Burmese: ရောဘတ်ဆန်းအောင်; born c. 1954) is a human rights lawyer and former political prisoner in Myanmar (Burma). Robert Sann Aung is known for his pro bono legal work, defending victims of human rights abuses, student activists, and human rights defenders, including child soldiers and protesters. He has received death threats for his public views on amending the 2008 Constitution of Myanmar, in the aftermath of the assassination of Ko Ni, another prominent Burmese lawyer.

== Career ==
Robert became a student activist shortly after his admission to the Rangoon Arts and Science University to study law in 1974. His education was disrupted numerous times due to his activism, and he graduated with a Bachelor of Laws in 1982.

Following the 1990 Myanmar general election, Robert defended a politician, Peter Linn Binn, who had challenged the election results. The ruling military regime threatened Robert, and revoked his license to practice law. He was disbarred from 1993 to 2012. Robert was imprisoned from 1997 to 2003 for his activism, and was the victim of a politically motivated attack in 2008.

In 2015, he became a finalist for the Martin Ennals Award for Human Rights Defenders.

== Personal life ==
Robert Sann Aung is a Muslim.
