= Balaives-et-Butz =

- Part of Flize
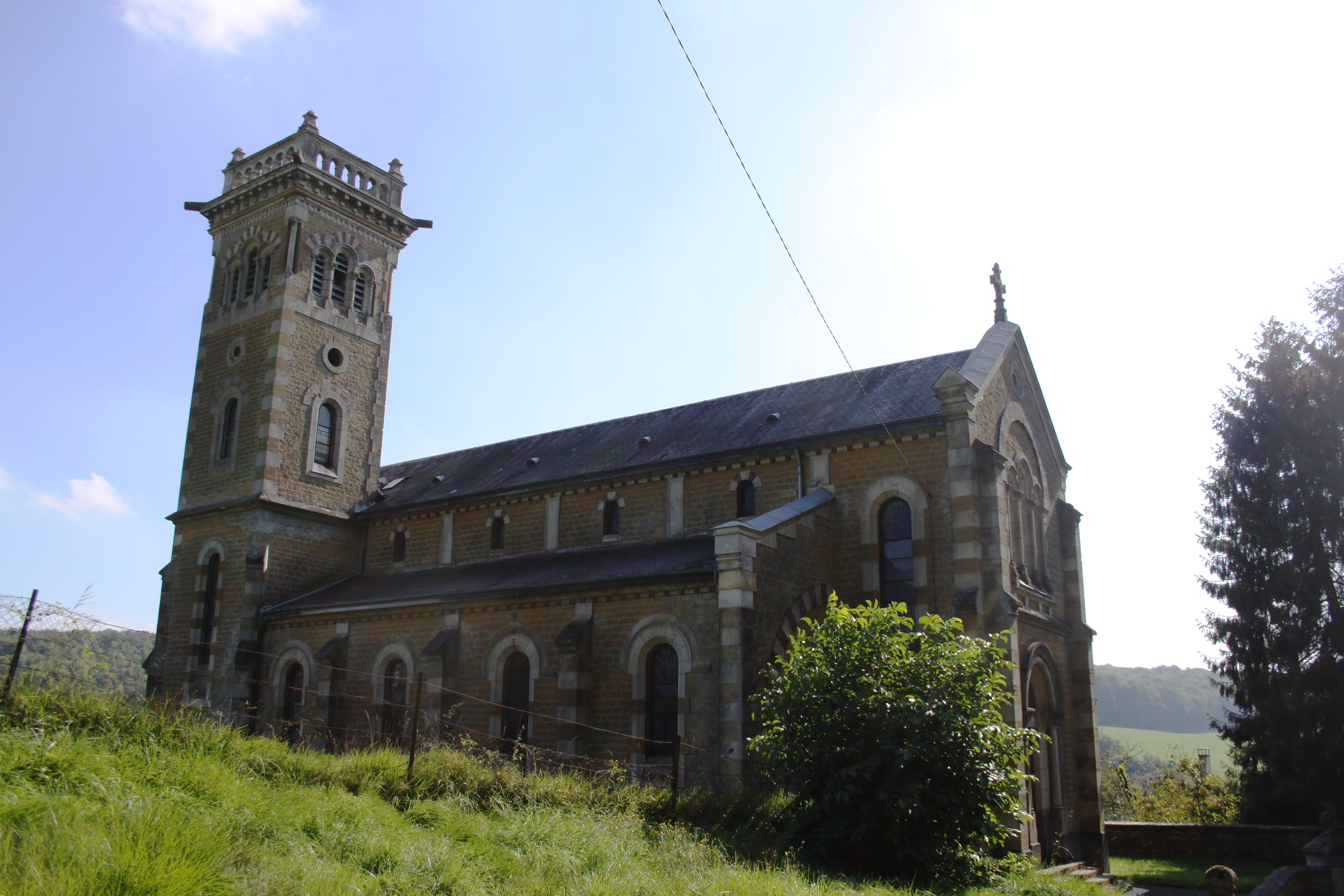
- The Church of Saint-Pierre-aux-Liens

- Coat of arms
- Location of Balaives-et-Butz
- Location within France Location within Grand Est
- Coordinates: 49°40′25″N 4°44′05″E
- Country: France
- Region: Grand Est
- Department: Ardennes
- Arrondissement: Charleville-Mézières
- Canton: Nouvion-sur-Meuse
- Commune: Flize
- Area^{1}: 11.05 km^{2} (4.27 sq mi)
- Elevation: 210 m (690 ft)
- Highest elevation: 326 m (1,070 ft)
- Lowest elevation: 173 m (568 ft)
- Population (2021): 202
  - Density: 18.3/km^{2} (47.3/sq mi)
- Time zone: UTC+01:00 (CET)
  - Summer (DST): UTC+02:00 (CEST)
- Postal code: 08160
- ^{1} French Land Register data, which excludes lakes, ponds, glaciers > 1 km^{2} (0.386 sq mi or 247 acres) and river estuaries.

Balaives-et-Butz is a former commune in the Ardennes department in the Grand Est region of northern France. On 1 January 2019, it was merged into the commune Flize.

The commune has been awarded two flowers by the National Council of Towns and Villages in Bloom in the Competition of cities and villages in Bloom.

== Geography ==
Balaives-et-Butz is located an est. 10 km south of Charleville-Mézières, and 5 km north-east of Poix-Terron. Access to the commune is by the D233 road from Boutancourt in the east, which passes through the south-eastern branch of the commune just south of the village then continues south-west to Singly. The village is accessed by the Rue du Routon which branches off the D233. The commune has large areas of forest with comparatively small areas of farmland.

The Ruisseau de Butz rises west of the village and flow east through the village then eastwards to join the Étang d'Alger and the Ruisseau de Boutancourt which eventually joins the Meuse at Flize. The Ruisseau de Bourbeuse rises south of the village and joins the Ruisseau de Butz in the village.

== History ==
The name Balaives means "beautiful water" from the nearby water sources.

=== Heraldry ===
Arms of Balaives-et-Butz	Blazon: Gules, a Cross of Or cantoned with 4 billets the same, in chief Azure charged with a lion passant guardant of Azure.

== Administration ==
List of Successive Mayors

From	To	Name
1952	1976	Jean Baudet
1995	2001	Jean-Christophe Oudin
2001	2019	Jean-Louis Milard

== Demography ==
The inhabitants of the commune are known as Balaiviens or Balaiviennes in French.

Historical population

Year	Pop.	±% p.a.
1793	212	—
1800	215	+0.20%
1806	231	+1.20%
1821	258	+0.74%
1831	402	+4.53%
1836	424	+1.07%
1841	434	+0.47%
1846	443	+0.41%
1851	437	−0.27%
1866	435	−0.03%
1872	393	−1.68%
1876	374	−1.23%
1881	384	+0.53%
1886	383	−0.05%
1891	356	−1.45%
1896	307	−2.92%
1901	279	−1.89%

Year	Pop.	±% p.a.
1906	247	−2.41%
1911	303	+4.17%
1921	212	−3.51%
1926	204	−0.77%
1931	198	−0.60%
1936	177	−2.22%
1946	170	−0.40%
1954	188	+1.27%
1962	212	+1.51%
1968	178	−2.87%
1975	181	+0.24%
1982	200	+1.44%
1990	216	+0.97%
1999	209	−0.37%
2007	231	+1.26%
2012	227	−0.35%
2021	202	−1.29%

Source: EHESS and INSEE

== Sites and monuments ==
A Fulling Water Mill (currently a Vynex Hardware factory) (18th century) is registered as an historical monument.

== See also ==
- Communes of the Ardennes department
