= Afon Elan =

River in mid Wales

Coordinates: 52°17′N 3°31′W

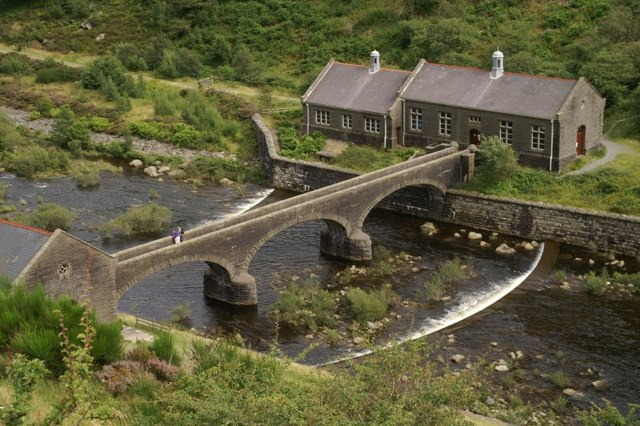
Footbridge over the Afon Elan below Caban Coch dam

Afon Elan (Welsh for 'River Elan') is a tributary of the River Wye which runs through the wide expanse of upland moors, traditionally known as Elenydd, in central Wales. Its valley is the Elan Valley. The name probably arises from elain meaning 'hind' or 'fawn' in reference perhaps to the rushing, bounding nature of its course.

It has its source in wet moorland on the eastern flank of Pen y Deunant in Ceredigion. It is joined by Nant Dderwen, Nant Cwta and Nant Hirin before entering the top of the Elan Valley Reservoirs at Craig Goch Reservoir which in turn discharges to Garreg-ddu Reservoir and then Caban-coch Reservoir. It emerges from this chain of reservoirs in a north-easterly direction and passes through Elan Village before turning south-east after 2 miles and making its confluence with the River Wye.
