= Eland (surname) =

Eland is a surname. Notable people with the surname include:

- Ivan Eland (born 1958), American defense analyst and author
- John Eland (chemist) (born 1941), British chemist and Fellow of the Royal Society
- John Eland (MP) (died 1542), English politician
- Ronald Eland, Canadian commercial helicopter pilot
- William Ronald Eland (1923–2003), South African weightlifter
