= Niger Delta =

Delta of the river Niger

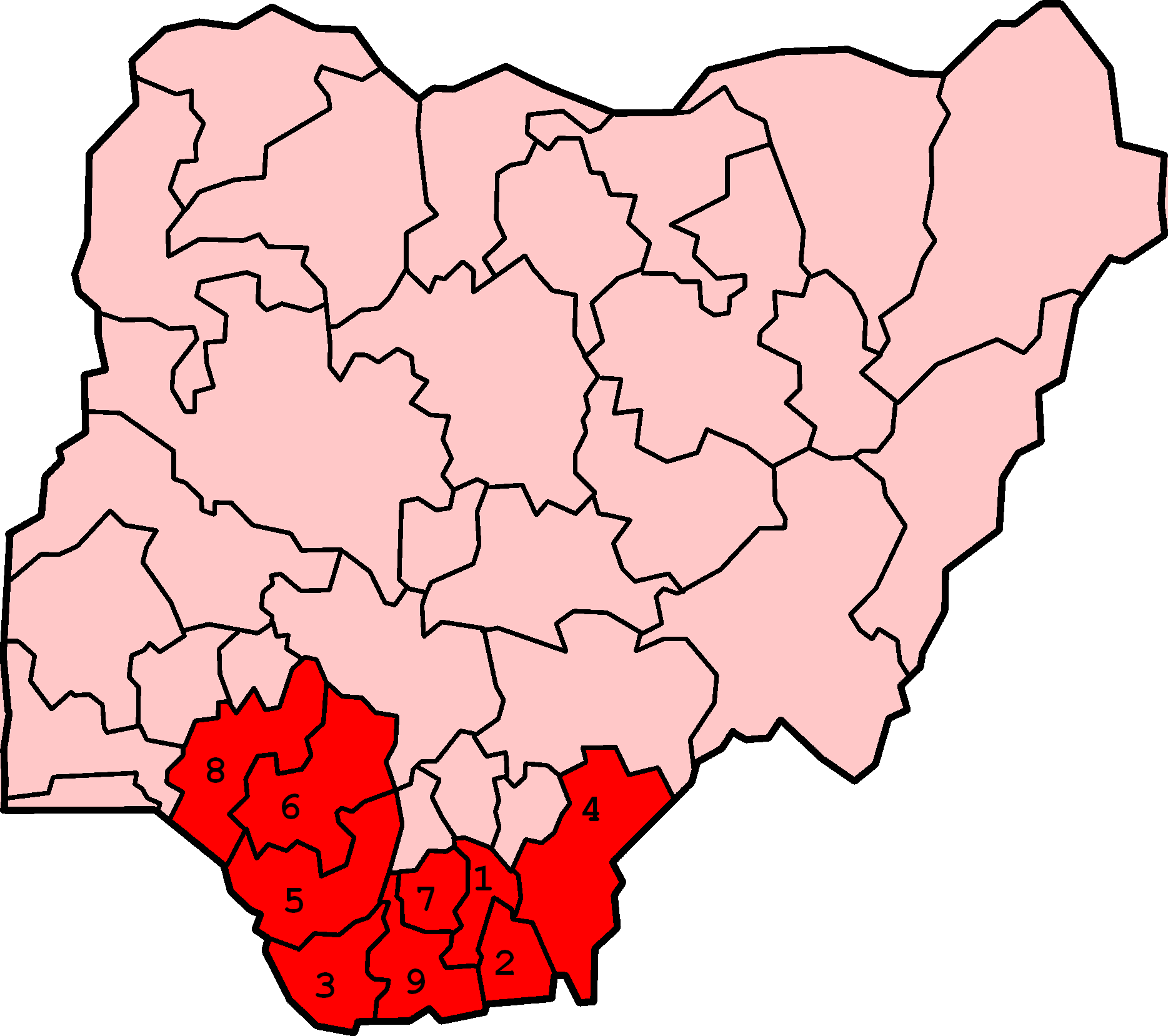
- Map of Nigeria numerically showing states typically considered part of the Niger Delta region: 1. Abia, 2. Akwa Ibom, 3. Bayelsa, 4. Cross River, 5. Delta, 6. Edo, 7.Imo, 8. Ondo, 9. Rivers

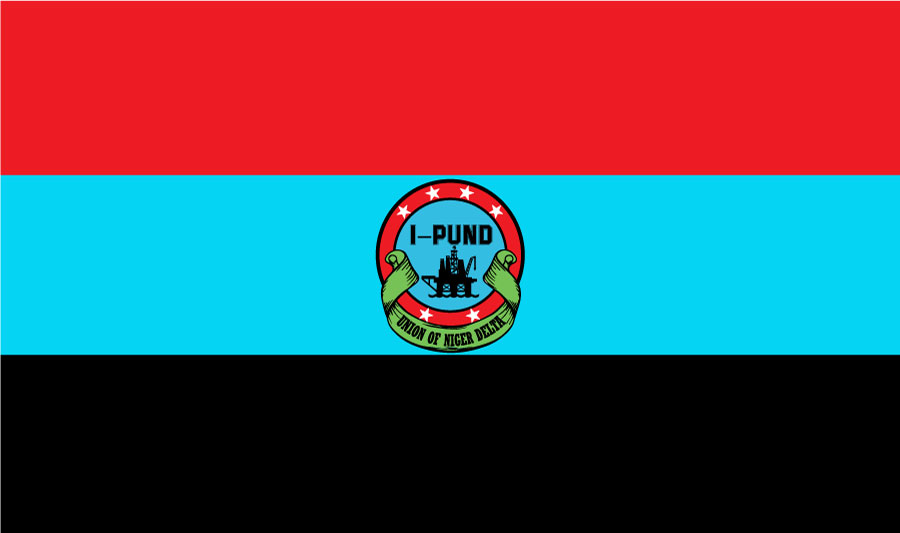
- Flag of the Niger Delta Republic, a proposed state
- Interactive map of Niger Delta
- Location: Southern Nigeria
- Coordinates: 5°19′N 6°28′E
- Area: 6,992,967 ha (27,000.00 sq mi)

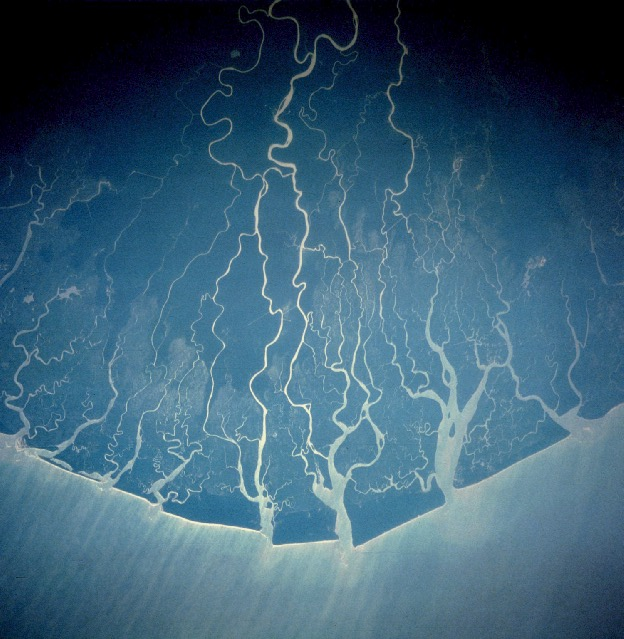
View of the Niger Delta from space (north/land at top).

The Niger Delta is the delta of the Niger River sitting directly on the Gulf of Guinea on the Atlantic Ocean in Nigeria. It is located within nine coastal southern Nigerian states, which include: all six states from the South South geopolitical zone, one state (Ondo) from South West geopolitical zone and two states (Abia and Imo) from South East geopolitical zone.

The Niger Delta is a very densely populated region sometimes called the Oil Rivers because it was once a major producer of palm oil. The area was the British Oil Rivers Protectorate from 1885 until 1893, when it was expanded and became the Niger Coast Protectorate.

The delta is a petroleum-rich region and has been the center of international concern over extensive pollution which is often used as an example of ecocide. The principal cause is major oil spills by multinational corporations of the petroleum industry.

== Geography ==
The Niger Delta, as now defined officially by the Nigerian government, extends over 70,000 km^{2} (27,000 sq mi) and makes up 7.5% of Nigeria's land mass. Historically and cartographically, it consists of present-day Bayelsa, Delta, and Rivers States. In 2000, however, Obasanjo's regime included Abia, Akwa-Ibom, Cross River State, Edo, Imo and Ondo States in the region.

The Niger Delta and the South-South geopolitical zone (which contains six of the states in the Niger Delta) are two different entities. The Niger Delta separates the Bight of Benin from the Bight of Bonny within the larger Gulf of Guinea.

== Demographics ==
The political Niger Delta is home to approximately 31 million people from over 40 ethnic groups, including the Ijaws—such as the Kalabari, Okrika, Epie-Atissa, Ogbia, Abua, Obolo, Opobo, Ibani, Apoi, Arogbo, Olodiama, Biseni, Akinima, Ekpeye, Ikwerre, Ogba, Ibibio, Urhobo, Annang, Oron, Efik, Ogoni, Edo, Esan, Isoko, Igbo, and Okpe among others. These communities speak around 250 different dialects. The Ijaw are the largest ethnic group in the Niger Delta, with a widespread presence across six states in the region.

The major language groups spoken in the Niger Delta include the Ijaw languages, Ibibio-Efik, Edoid languages.

== History ==
=== Colonial period ===
The area was the British Oil Rivers Protectorate from 1885 until 1893 when it was expanded and became the Niger Coast Protectorate. The core Niger Delta later became a part of the eastern region of Nigeria, which came into being in 1951 (one of the three regions, and later one of the four regions). The majority of the people were those from the colonial Calabar and Ogoja divisions, the present-day Ogoja, Annang, Ibibio, Oron, Efik, Ijaw and Ogoni people. The National Council of Nigeria and Cameroon (NCNC) was the ruling political party of the region. The NCNC later became the National Convention of Nigerian Citizens, after western Cameroon decided to separate from Nigeria. The ruling party of eastern Nigeria did not seek to preclude the separation and even encouraged it. The then Eastern Region had the third, fourth, and fifth largest indigenous ethnic groups in the country, which are the Igbo, Ijaw abd Ibibio .

In 1953, the Old Eastern region had a major crisis when professor Eyo Ita was expelled from office by the majority Igbo tribe of the Old Eastern region. Ita, an Efik man from Calabar, was one of the pioneer nationalists for Nigerian independence. The non-igbo of the then eastern region, the Ibibio, Annang, Efik, Ijaw and Ogoja, situated along the southeastern coast and in the delta region and demanded a state of their own, which they called the Calabar-Ogoja-Rivers (COR) state. The Ibibio people of the present Akwa Ibom State and Cross River State also championed for their stated theough the Ibibio State Union. The struggle for the creation of the COR state continued and was a major issue concerning the status of minorities in Nigeria during debates in Europe on Nigerian independence. As a result of this crisis, Professor Eyo Ita left the NCNC to form a new political party called the National Independence Party which was one of the five Nigerian political parties represented at the conferences on Nigerian Constitution and Independence.

=== Post-colonial period ===
In 1961, another major crisis occurred when the then-eastern region of Nigeria allowed present-day southwestern Cameroon to separate from Nigeria (from the region of what is now Akwa Ibom and Cross River states) through a plebiscite while the leadership of the Northern Region took the necessary steps to keep northwestern Cameroon in Nigeria, in present-day Adamawa and Taraba states. The aftermath of the 1961 plebiscite has led to a dispute between Cameroon and Nigeria over the small territory of Bakassi.

A new phase of the struggle saw the declaration of an Independent Niger Delta Republic by Isaac Adaka Boro during Nigerian president Ironsi's administration, just before the Nigerian Civil War. Also just before the Nigerian civil war, Southeastern State of Nigeria was created (also known as Southeastern Nigeria or Coastal Southeastern Nigeria), which had the colonial Calabar division, and colonial Ogoja division. Rivers State was also created. Southeastern State and River State became two states for the minorities of the old eastern region, and the majority Igbo of the old eastern region had a state called East Central State. Southeastern State was renamed Cross River State and was later split into Cross River State and Akwa Ibom State. Rivers State was later divided into Rivers State and Bayelsa State.

=== Nigerian Civil War ===
Niger Delta people suffered heavily with the great loss of lives and properties, hunger and starvation, and sustained many deaths during 1967–1970 Nigerian Civil War, also known as the Biafran War, in which the eastern region declared an independent state named Biafra that was eventually defeated. During this period, schools were shut down completely, and gunfire became a daily occurrence.

=== Non-violent resistance ===
Following the civil war, local communities increasingly demanded social and environmental justice from the federal government, with Ken Saro Wiwa and the Ogoni tribe as the lead figures for this phase of the struggle. Cohesive oil protests became most pronounced in 1990 with the publication of the Ogoni Bill of Rights. Indigenous people protested against the lack of economic development, e.g. schools, good roads, and hospitals, in the region, despite all the oil wealth created. They also complained about environmental pollution and the destruction of their land and rivers by foreign oil companies. Ken Saro Wiwa and nine other oil activists from Movement for the Survival of the Ogoni People (MOSOP) were arrested and killed under Sani Abacha in 1995.

=== Recent armed conflict ===
When long-held concerns about loss of control over resources to the oil companies were voiced by the Ijaw people in the Kaiama Declaration in 1998, the Nigerian government sent troops to occupy the Bayelsa and Delta states. Soldiers opened fire with rifles, machine guns, and tear gas, killing at least three protesters and arresting twenty-five more. Since then, local Indigenous activity against commercial oil refineries and pipelines in the region has increased in frequency and militancy. Recently foreign employees of Shell, the primary corporation operating in the region, were taken hostage by local people. Such activities have also resulted in greater governmental intervention in the area and the mobilization of the Nigerian Army and State Security Service into the region, resulting in violence and human rights abuses. In April 2006, a bomb exploded near an oil refinery in the Niger Delta region, a warning against Chinese expansion in the region. The Movement for the Emancipation of the Niger Delta (MEND) stated: "We wish to warn the Chinese government and its oil companies to steer well clear of the Niger Delta. The Chinese government, by investing in stolen crude, places its citizens in our line of fire."

Government and private initiatives to develop the Niger Delta region have been introduced recently. These include the Niger Delta Development Commission, a government initiative, and the Development Initiative, a community development non-governmental organization based in Port Harcourt. Uz and Uz Transnational, a company with a strong commitment to the Niger Delta, has introduced ways of developing the poor in the Niger Delta, especially in Rivers State. In September 2008, MEND released a statement proclaiming that their militants had launched an "oil war" throughout the Niger Delta against both, pipelines and oil-production facilities, and the Nigerian soldiers that protect them. Both MEND and the Nigerian Government claim to have inflicted heavy casualties on one another. In August 2009, the Nigerian government granted amnesty to the militants; many militants subsequently surrendered their weapons in exchange for a presidential pardon, rehabilitation programme, and education.

== Sub-regions ==
Western Niger Delta consists of the western section of coastal South-South Nigeria which includes Delta, and the southernmost parts of Edo, and Ondo States. The western (or Northern) Niger Delta is a heterogeneous society with several ethnic groups including the Urhobo, The Western Igbos; Ika people, Aniocha People, Isoko, Ijaw (or Izon) and Ukwuani, Itsekiri the Bini, Esan, Auchi, Esako, oral, and Afenmai in Edo State; and the Ilaje Yoruba in Ondo State. Their livelihoods are primarily based on fishing and farming. History has it that the Western Niger was controlled by Kings of the four primary ethnic groups the Urhobo, Isoko, Ijaw, and, Itsekiri with whom the British government had to sign separate "Treaties of Protection" in their formation of "Protectorates" that later became southern Nigeria.

Central Niger Delta consists of the central section of coastal South-South Nigeria which includes Bayelsa, Rivers, Abia, and Imo States. The Central Niger Delta region has the Ijaw (including the Nembe-Brass, Ogbia, Kalabari people, Ibani of Opobo & Bonny, Abua, Okrika, Engenni and Andoni clans), the Ogoni people (Khana, Gokana, Tai and Eleme), The Igbos (the Etche, Egbema, Omuma, Ogba, Ikwerre, Ndoni, Ekpeye and Ndoki) in Rivers State.

Eastern Niger Delta consists of Cross River State and Akwa Ibom State. It has the homogeneous Annang, Efik, Ibibio and Oron people, Ogoja (that includes Ekoi and Bekwara).

== Nigerian oil ==
Nigeria has become West Africa's biggest producer of petroleum. Some 2 million barrels (320,000 m^{3}) per day are extracted in the Niger Delta, with an estimated 38 billion barrels of reserves. The first oil operations in the region began in the 1950s and were undertaken by multinational corporations, which provided Nigeria with necessary technological and financial resources to extract oil. Since 1975, the region has accounted for more than 75% of Nigeria's export earnings. Together oil and natural gas extraction comprise "97 percent of Nigeria's foreign exchange revenues". More than 70% of the natural gas extracted in oil wells in the delta is immediately burned, or flared, into the air at a rate of approximately 70 million m^{3} per day. This is equivalent to 41% of African natural gas consumption and forms the largest single source of greenhouse gas emissions on the planet. In 2003, about 99% of excess gas was flared in the Niger Delta, although this value has fallen to 11% in 2010. (See also gas flaring volumes). The biggest gas flaring company is the Shell Petroleum Development Company of Nigeria Ltd, a joint venture that is majority-owned by the Nigerian government. In Nigeria, "...despite regulations introduced 20 years ago to outlaw the practice, most associated gas is flared, causing local pollution and contributing to climate change." The environmental devastation associated with the industry and the lack of distribution of oil wealth have been the source and/or key aggravating factors of numerous environmental movements and inter-ethnic conflicts in the region, including recent guerrilla activity by MEND.

In September 2012 Eland Oil & Gas purchased a 45% interest in OML 40, with its partner Starcrest Energy Nigeria Limited, from the Shell Group. They intend to recommission the existing infrastructure and restart existing wells to re-commence production at an initial gross rate of 2,500 barrels (400 m^{3}) of oil per day with a target to grow gross production to 50,000 barrels (7,900 m^{3}) of oil per day within four years.

=== Oil revenue derivation ===
Oil revenue allocation has been the subject of much contention well before Nigeria gained its independence. Allocations have varied from as much as 50%, owing to the First Republic's high degree of regional autonomy, and as low as 10% during the military dictatorships.

Oil revenue sharing formula
Year	Federal	State*	Local	Special Projects	Derivation Formula**
1958	40%	60%	0%	0%	50%
1968	80%	20%	0%	0%	10%
1977	75%	22%	3%	0%	10%
1982	55%	32.5%	10%	2.5%	10%
1989	50%	24%	15%	11%	10%
1995	48.5%	24%	20%	7.5%	13%
2001	48.5%	24%	20%	7.5%	13%

* State allocations are based on 5 criteria: equality (equal shares per state), population, social development, land mass, and revenue generation.

**The derivation formula refers to the percentage of the revenue oil-producing states retain from taxes on oil and other natural resources produced in the state. World Bank Report

== Media ==
The documentary film Sweet Crude, which premiered April 2009 at the Full Frame Documentary Film Festival, tells the story of Nigeria's Niger Delta.

== Environmental issues ==
The Niger Delta is a region of unparalleled ecological richness, characterized by its intricate network of waterways, lush mangrove forests, and diverse ecosystems. However, the serene beauty of this landscape has been damaged by a persistent environmental menace, oil spills. Over the years, the Niger Delta has experienced a series of devastating oil spills, primarily caused by industrial activities related to the extraction and transportation of oil and gas. Due to this high amount of spills, the Niger Delta is considered one of the most polluted areas on Earth. These spills have inflicted severe and continuous damage on the delicate balance of the region's ecosystems. They impact both the environment and the livelihoods of the communities that depend on its resources.

Two spills in 2008 and 2009 have been the largest and most harmful by far, collectively lasting for almost 150 days and causing flora death throughout 393 km2. The extensive network of tidal rivers and mangrove swamps makes it even easier for the oil to spread quickly, and the delta becomes a sink, trapping the oil that is not removed. The spills came from a pipeline operated by Shell Petroleum Development Company. In addition to smaller spills that took place over the years 2006–2019, it is estimated that a total of 92,479,170 liters (or 24430412.139 gallons) of crude oil were released into the studied area.

Since then, following spills have continued to exacerbate the ecological damage. The exact impact of spills like these is hard to know because traditional field studies are nearly impossible in this region. However, techniques such as the normalized difference vegetation index have been successful in measuring the impact of oil spills on the river's plant health. Additionally, independently collected field samples have confirmed the presence of hydrocarbon pollutants in high concentrations in the impacted areas.

Oil and gas pollution/spills greatly increase the possibility of human exposure to dangerous chemicals. Many components of crude oil are particularly concerning due to their link to the health problems caused by exposure. This includes organic contaminants such as polycyclic aromatic hydrocarbons, benzene, toluene, ethylbenzene and xylene, as well as heavy metals such as lead, vanadium and cadmium. In fact, according to the Scientific Committee on Health, Environmental and Emerging Risks, more than 1300 different chemicals can be put into the environment as a result of oil and gas exploration. Then, humans come in contact with these harmful substances through eating contaminated food as well as breathing in the air pollution. Polycyclic aromatic hydrocarbons are especially concerning because of their persistence in the environment. Even in low amounts, prolonged exposure can cause serious health issues such as cancer and other chronic illnesses. In general, the harmful pollutants emitted from oil spills and other pollution include cancer, metabolic syndrome, miscarriages, stillbirths, and infertility. Less deadly, but still serious, health problems include headache, watery eyes, sore throat, respiratory problems, itchy skin, rashes on face and neck, sneezing, coughing, nausea, dizziness, chest pain, and diarrhea are common issues caused from oil spills.

Collectively, more than 1 million people live in the area that has been contaminated by oil/gas pollution. This population is especially vulnerable to chronic illnesses because of their pre-existing low life expectancy and large ratio of young people. Additionally, a 2006 report done by the United Nations Development Programme says "The Niger Delta is a region suffering from administrative neglect, crumbling social infrastructure and services, high unemployment, social deprivation, abject poverty, filth and squalor, and endemic conflict,". These factors make it increasingly harder for the local communities to deal with the negative effects caused by foreign oil exploration.

The people affected by oil spills in the Niger Delta are diverse communities residing in the region. Their lives are intricately connected to the natural environment. These communities, often made up of indigenous groups, rely on the Niger Delta's resources for their food, water, livelihoods, and cultural practices. The impact of oil spills on these communities is multi-faceted and extends beyond health problems. Fishing and agriculture are central to the livelihoods of many Niger Delta communities. Oil spills contaminate water sources and farmlands, severely affecting fish stocks and crops. This disruption can lead to food shortages and economic hardship for those dependent on these activities.

Another facet of the people's livelihoods is their culture. The Niger Delta's people have strong spiritual and cultural ties to their environment. The harm inflicted on their land and waterways caused by oil spills deeply disrupts sacred sites and interferes with their cultural practices. The loss of these cultural elements contributes to a sense of displacement and identity crisis among the affected groups/communities.

Additionally, when communities fight back against the oil industries as an act of protest, violence is often perpetuated. Since the 1990s there has been continuous violence in an effort to give local communities control of the oil in the delta. These acts of violence include the kidnapping of foreign oil workers and holding them for ransom, vandalization, and even the blowing up of oil installations.
