= Ko Ni =

Burmese constitutional lawyer (1953–2017)

U Ko Ni
- ကိုနီ
- Born: 11 February 1953; Katha, Sagaing Division, Burma
- Died: 29 January 2017 (aged 63); Yangon
- Cause of death: Assassination
- Resting place: Yayway Cemetery
- Education: B.A. (1975), LL.B. (1976), Rangoon Arts and Science University
- Occupation: Lawyer
- Years active: 1976–2017
- Known for: Writer, legal advisor to the NLD
- Spouse: Tin Tin Aye
- Children: Yin Nwe Khaing; Aye Thi Khaing; Thant Zin Oo
- Parents: Sultan Mohamed (father); Halima Khin Hla (mother)

Ko Ni (Burmese: ကိုနီ, pronounced [kò nì]); 11 February 1953 – 29 January 2017) was a prominent Burmese lawyer and an expert on constitutional law. He was assassinated by gunshot in Yangon, Myanmar, on 29 January 2017.

== Early life and education ==
Ko Ni was born near Katha in Sagaing Division, Burma (now Myanmar) to a poor family of farmers and shopkeepers. A Burmese Muslim, his father was Sultan Mohamed, a Muslim from India, and his mother was Khin Hla (also known as Halima), a Burmese Buddhist. His father had come to Burma in the early 1900s through his work with the British Indian Army. His mother also had a Muslim father and a Buddhist mother.

Ko Ni worked as a day laborer to pay for his undergraduate studies. He graduated from the Rangoon Arts and Science University with a Bachelor of Arts degree in 1975, and a Bachelor of Laws degree in 1976.

== Legal career ==
Ko Ni was a founder of Laurel Law Firm, and a member of the International Bar Association, the Independent Lawyers' Association of Myanmar, and the Myanmar Writers and Journalists Association.

== Political career ==
He joined the National League for Democracy (NLD) officially on 8 October 2013, after being a legal advisor to Aung San Suu Kyi for many years before that. He was credited with finding loopholes in the 2008 Constitution of Myanmar and in particular with creating the office of state counsellor, which enabled Aung San Suu Kyi to become the de facto head of government in 2016. He advocated constitutional change in Myanmar, believing that the 2008 Constitution, which was drafted by the military, should be replaced and not merely amended. He wrote six books on human rights issues and democratic elections, and was actively involved in the interfaith movement. He also spoke out against the Myanmar nationality law that stripped the Muslim minority Rohingya of Burmese citizenship. Due to his open sympathy to the Rohingyas and his call for constitutional reforms, he had become frequently targeted and threatened before death.

== Assassination ==
Ko Ni was fatally shot on 29 January 2017 at Yangon International Airport on his way back from attending a senior leadership program in Indonesia, studying democracy and conflict resolution, with a delegation led by Pe Myint, the Union Minister for Information.

=== Arrest and motives ===
Police arrested Kyi Lin, the gunman, shortly after the shooting. The gunman had also shot and killed Nay Win, a taxi driver who attempted to intervene. Allegations emerged in social media that Kyaw Swe, the Minister of Home Affairs and former Commander of South-west Command in Pathein, Ayeyarwady Region had orchestrated the killing. The assistant secretary of the Home Affairs Ministry, Maung Maung Myint, issued a statement on 1 February 2017, denying the allegations as "rumors."

Subsequent police investigations uncovered that the plot to assassinate Ko Ni had begun in April 2016 when three former Burmese military officers met at a Yangon teahouse. The three officers included Zeyar Phyo, a retired military intelligence captain, Aung Win Khine, a retired lieutenant colonel, and Lin Zaw Tun, an ex-colonel who formerly served in the office of the commander-in-chief Min Aung Hlaing from 2011 to 2015, and had departed to become a Union Solidarity and Development Party politician. The three had concocted a scheme to find a gunman to kill Ko Ni. Zeyar Phyo gave Aung Win Khine US$80,000 to pay for the operation, and the latter sourced Kyi Lin, an ex-convict, as the hitman.

=== Funeral ===
His funeral attracted thousands of mourners, regardless of religious affiliation. Notably absent among the mourners was Aung San Suu Kyi. Ko Ni was buried at Yayway Cemetery in Yangon.

=== Reactions ===
Senior NLD leader Tin Oo described Ko Ni's death as a "great loss for the country, for democratic forces and for us (the party)". US Ambassador Scot Marciel said: "All I want to say is, of course we are all shocked and really sad. I knew Ko Ni and his commitment to his country and democracy."

Amnesty International said the killing had "all the hallmarks of an assassination". It called for a thorough investigation into the death of a man it described as a "tireless human rights campaigner".

=== Outcomes ===
Kyi Lin and his accomplice Aung Win Zaw received death sentences in February 2019. The latter's brother, Aung Win Tun, received a three year sentence for hiding his brother after the killing. Zeyar Phyo received five years in prison for destroying trial evidence, after the initial charge against him for financing the assassination was suddenly dropped before the verdict. Aung Win Khine evaded arrest and remains at large. Lin Zaw Tun was not arrested or charged for his participation. In December 2020, three nationalist supporters of Kyi Lin received 1 year sentences of hard labour, for wearing provocative t-shirts with threatening slogans during Kyi Lin's trial.

In September 2020, prosecutors submitted a special appeal to the Supreme Court of Myanmar to mete out harsher sentences to those involved in Ko Ni's murder.

== Personal life ==
Ko Ni was married to Tin Tin Aye, with whom he had three children. One of his daughters, Yin Nwe Khaing, is a medical doctor.
