= Arboretum d'Élan =

Arboretum in Ardennes, Grand Est, France

Coordinates: 49°39′22″N 4°45′16″E

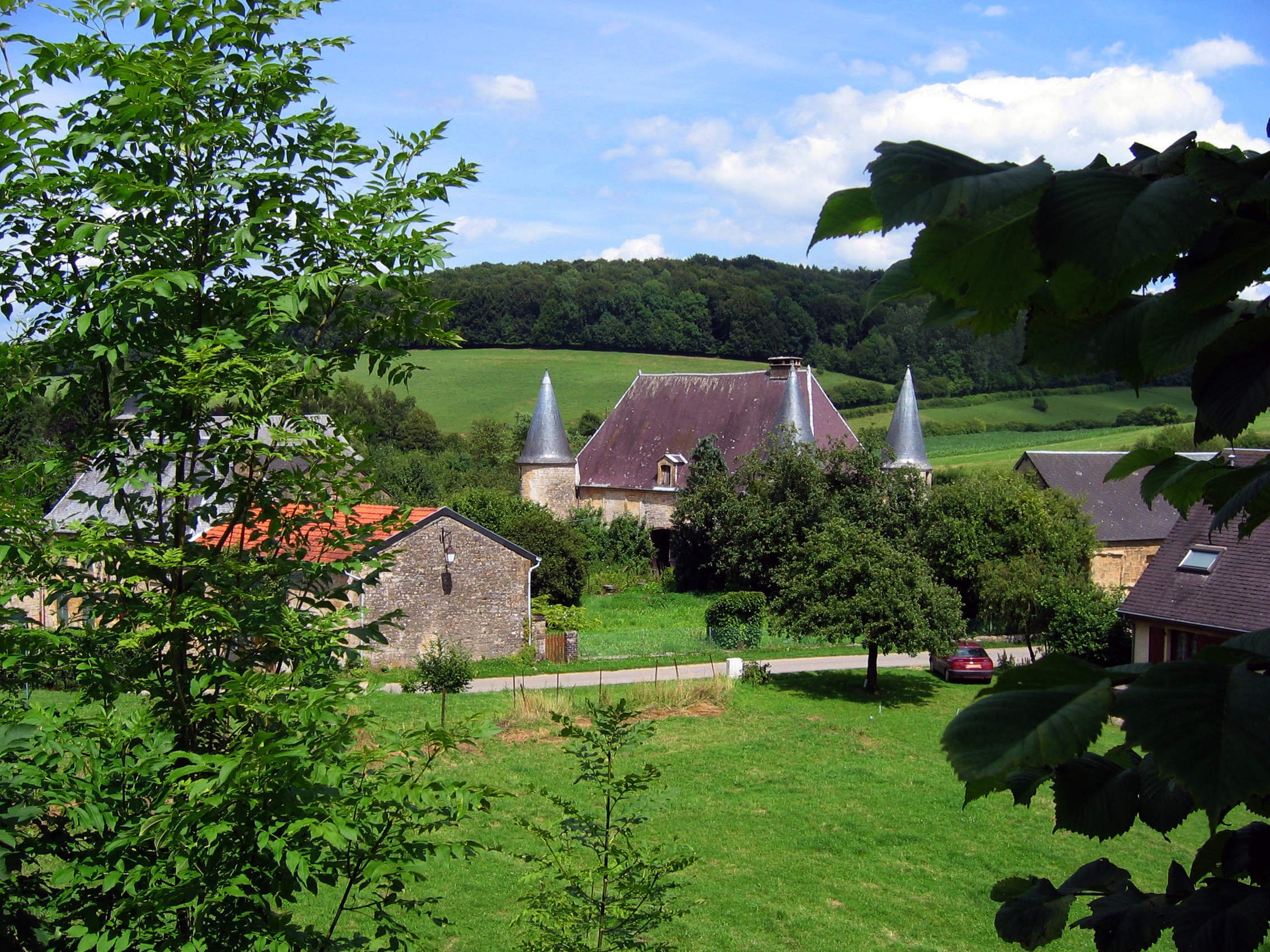
Arboretum d'Élan

The Arboretum d'Élan is a small arboretum located in Élan, Ardennes, Grand Est, France. It is open daily without charge.

The arboretum was established by the Office National des Forêts (National Forestry Office) near the Chapelle Saint-Roger, an 18th-century chapel built to honor the founder of Élan Abbey (established 1148).

== See also ==
- List of botanical gardens in France
