= Elan Valley Railway =

Industrial railway in mid Wales

The Elan Valley Railway (EVR) was a Welsh industrial railway built to assist in the construction of the Elan Valley Reservoirs in mid Wales. It was in operation from 1896 to about 1912/1916.

== History ==
The four dams in the Elan Valley were built to supply water to Birmingham, and were authorized by an act of parliament in June 1891. By 1893 dam construction was underway and the railway was completed in 1896. At its maximum extent, the railway had 33 miles (53 km) of track supporting the construction work, running from a junction with the Cambrian Railways Mid Wales line near Rhayader to, at the furthest point, the Craig Goch dam site.

The railway, built in standard gauge which consisted of four lines, known as Railway No. 1, Railway No. 2, Railway No. 3 and Railway No. 4, was owned and operated by the Birmingham Corporation Water Department (now Birmingham City Council) which also owned the dams and associated works. The railway was mainly operated using a fleet of steam locomotives owned by the corporation, with occasional assistance from locomotives borrowed from neighbouring railways.

The dams were officially opened by King Edward VII on 21 July 1904, although construction continued until 1906. The railway connection with the Cambrian Railways line was reduced from a loop and double junction to a single junction in June 1908, as traffic reduced. The majority of the EVR was lifted by 1912, with the final main line track being removed in 1916.

As of 1997, most of the line was walkable; and three such walks have been described.
