= Roger of Ellant =

Beatified English Cistercian monk

- Died: c.1175
- Other names: Abbot

Roger of Ellant was a Christian abbot who is considered blessed by the Catholic Church.

== Life ==
Roger was born in England and flourished in the twelfth century. He joined the Cistercians in France. He was the founding abbot of the Élan Abbey in the Diocese of Rheims.

According to Alban Butler,

Having embraced the Cistercian order at Leroy, or Locus Regis, in Berry, he was chosen abbot of Elan, near Retel, in Champagne, and died about the year 1175. His remains are enshrined in a chapel, which bears his name, in the church at Elan, where his festival is kept with a mass in his honour on the 13th of February. His life was written by a monk of Elan. See Chatelain, on the 4th of January, on which day his name occurs in a Cistercian calendar printed at Dijon.

== Sources ==
- Butler, Alban (1798), The Lives of the Primitive Fathers, Martyrs, and Other Principal Saints... by the Rev. Alban Butler..., vol. II, J. Moir
- Monks of Ramsgate (1921), "Roger", Book of Saints – via CatholicSaints.Info
