= Flize =

- Commune
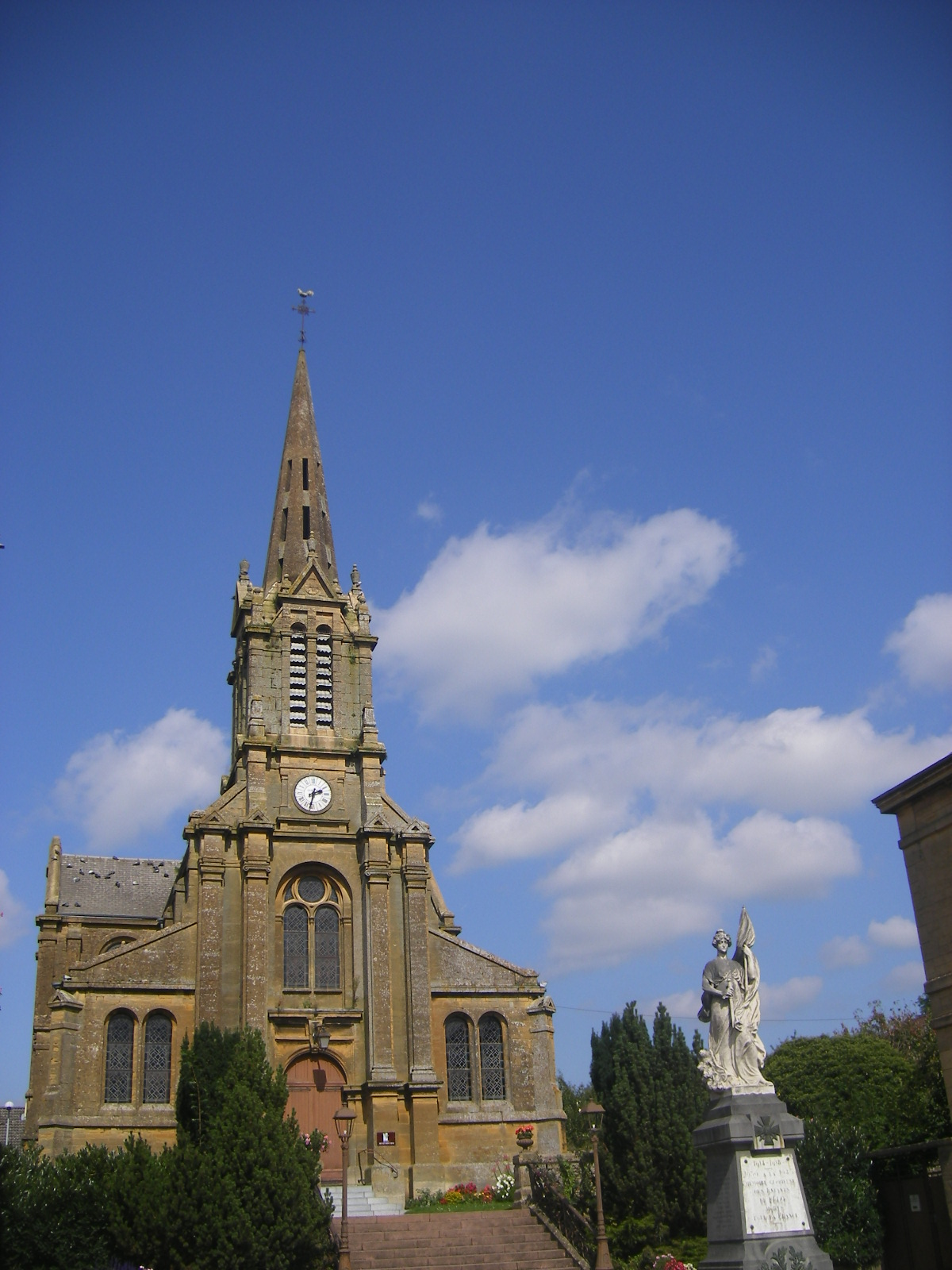
- The church in Flize

- Coat of arms
- Location of Flize
- Location within France Location within Grand Est
- Coordinates: 49°41′58″N 4°46′27″E
- Country: France
- Region: Grand Est
- Department: Ardennes
- Arrondissement: Charleville-Mézières
- Canton: Nouvion-sur-Meuse
- Intercommunality: CA Ardenne Métropole

Government
  - Mayor (2020–2026): Cédric Branz
- Area^{1}: 25.97 km^{2} (10.03 sq mi)
- Population (2023): 1,683
  - Density: 64.81/km^{2} (167.8/sq mi)
- Time zone: UTC+01:00 (CET)
  - Summer (DST): UTC+02:00 (CEST)
- INSEE/Postal code: 08173 /08160
- ^{1} French Land Register data, which excludes lakes, ponds, glaciers > 1 km^{2} (0.386 sq mi or 247 acres) and river estuaries.

Flize (French pronunciation: [fliz]) is a commune in the Ardennes department in northern France. On 1 January 2019, the former communes of Balaives-et-Butz, Boutancourt and Élan were merged into Flize.

== Population ==
Population data refer to the area corresponding with the commune as of January 2025.

Historical population
Year	Pop.	±% p.a.
1968	1,826	—
1975	1,551	−2.30%
1982	1,564	+0.12%
1990	1,780	+1.63%
1999	1,844	+0.39%
2007	1,757	−0.60%
2012	1,765	+0.09%
2017	1,723	−0.48%
2023	1,683	−0.39%
Source: INSEE

== See also ==
- Communes of the Ardennes department
