= Elan Valley Reservoirs =

Man-made lakes in Mid Wales

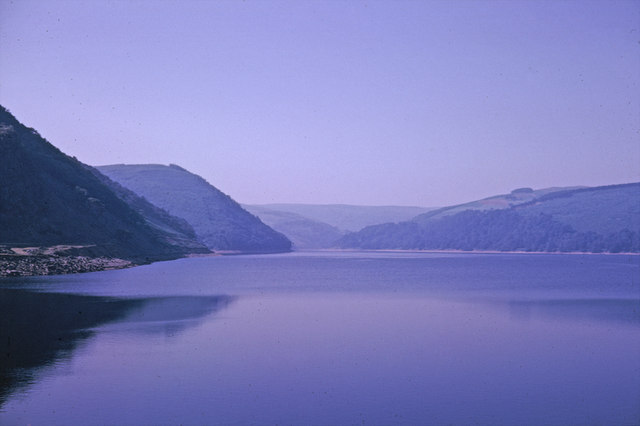
- Caban-coch Reservoir c. 1963.

- Location within Wales
- Location: Elan Valley in Powys, Wales
- Coordinates: 52°16′20″N 3°41′20″W
- Lake type: Reservoirs
- Primary inflows: River Elan; River Claerwen
- Primary outflows: Elan aqueduct River Elan
- Managing agency: Dŵr Cymru Welsh Water
- Built: 1893
- First flooded: 1896
- Max. length: 5.9 km (3.7 mi)
- Max. width: 0.5 km (0.31 mi)
- Surface area: 606 ha (1,500 acres)
- Average depth: 41.5 m (136 ft)
- Max. depth: 56 m (184 ft)
- Water volume: 99,499,000 m^{3} (80,665 acre⋅ft)
- Surface elevation: Between 250–368 m (820–1,207 ft)
- References: Specifications, Elan Valley Visitor Centre

The Elan Valley Reservoirs (Welsh: Cronfeydd Cwm Elan) are a chain of man-made lakes created from damming the Elan and Claerwen rivers within the Elan Valley in Mid Wales. The reservoirs, which were built by the Birmingham Corporation Water Department, provide clean drinking water for Birmingham in the West Midlands of England. The five lakes are known as the Claerwen, Craig-goch, Pen-y-garreg, Garreg-ddu, and Caban-coch.

Water from the reservoirs is carried by gravity to Frankley Reservoir in Birmingham via the Elan aqueduct. Pumping is not required because the network drops 52 metres (171 ft) along its 73-mile (117 km) length from its source to Frankley. A gradient of 1:2,300 maintains a flow of less than 2 miles per hour (3.2 km/h); water takes one and a half to two days to reach Birmingham. The aqueduct, which was started in 1896 and opened in 1906, crosses several valleys and features numerous brick tunnels, pipelines, and valve houses.

Work to build the Elan Valley reservoirs was undertaken because the rapid growth of the industrial city of Birmingham in the late 19th century had led to a lack of available clean water. Numerous outbreaks of disease prompted Birmingham City Council to petition the British government which passed the Birmingham Corporation Water Act 1892 (55 & 56 Vict. c. clxxiii). It allowed the corporation to acquire by compulsory purchase all the land within the water catchment area of the Elan Valleys. Thousands of navvies (workers) and their families lived in the purpose-built Elan Village during the construction of the first four dams at the turn of the 20th century. In 1952, the Claerwen dam was opened by Elizabeth II in one of her first official engagements as monarch.

Drinking water from the Elan Valley is noted for being exceptionally soft, contrasting with water from local supplies in the West Midlands, not served by the Elan aqueduct, which are noted for hardness.

The reservoirs are now owned and managed by Dŵr Cymru Welsh Water. The water filtration works further down the valley is run by Severn Trent Water.

== Description ==
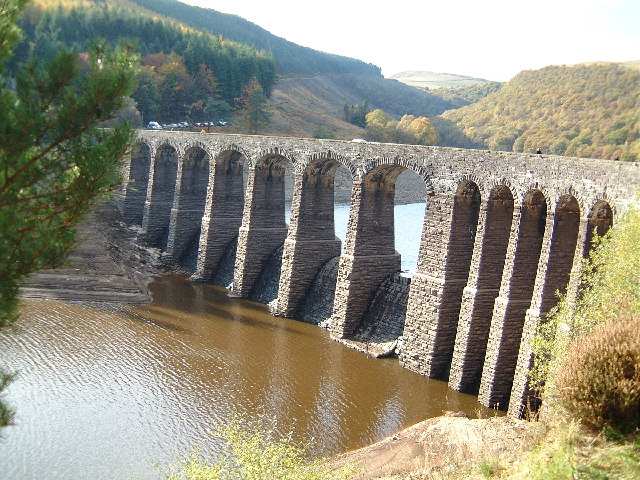
Garreg-ddu dam seen at low water, summer 2003. Its job is to maintain a constant level in the reservoir during drought conditions so water can still enter the Elan Valley aqueduct.

There are four main dams and reservoirs (constructed 1893–1904 in Elan Valley, and 1946–1952 at Claerwen) with a potential total capacity of nearly 100,000 megalitres. The dams and reservoirs are:

- Caban-coch – 35,530 megalitre capacity
- Pen-y-garreg – 6,055 megalitre capacity
- Craig-goch – 9,220 megalitre capacity
- Claerwen – 48,694 megalitre capacity

In addition to the four main dams, there are three other dams at the site:

- The Dol-y-mynach dam – it was to be one of a series of three dams that would be built to contain the waters of Afon Claerwen. They were to be constructed in accordance with the growth of Birmingham. However, the project was never completed even though the masonry foundations of the first dam were laid at the same time the Elan Valley dams were being constructed. The work had to be done in advance because the water level of the Caban Coch would have submerged the site once the reservoir was full. The three-dam project became redundant when newer materials and superior engineering allowed the construction of the single larger Claerwen dam higher up the valley in the 1940/50s.
- The Nant-y-Gro dam – this small dam was constructed in the early stages of the project to supply water to the navvies' village at the site; it was used during the Second World War by Sir Barnes Wallis during trials of the explosive charges he intended to use in the bouncing bombs which later targeted the Ruhr dams in Germany.
- The Garreg-ddu dam – although looking like a viaduct, it is actually a submerged dam. Its role is to maintain a sufficient level in the Garreg-ddu reservoir so water can enter the Foel Tower and the gravity-driven aqueduct to the Frankley Reservoir in Birmingham. The dam is only required to operate during times of extreme drought.
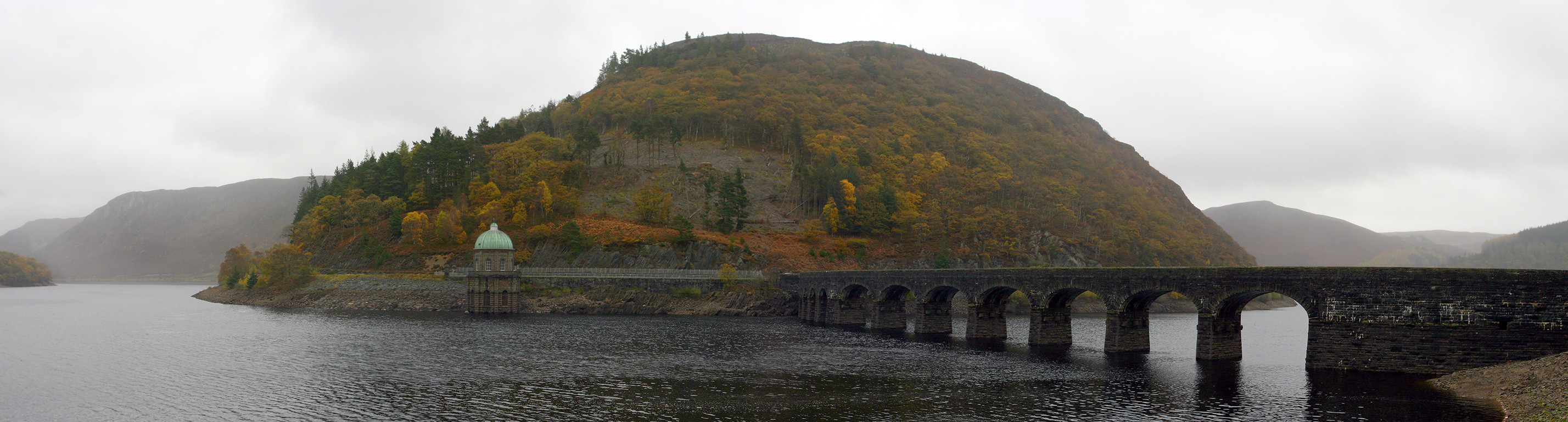
Garreg-ddu (left) and Caban-coch (right), October 2007. The two reservoirs are separated by a submerged dam that maintains water levels during drought conditions.

== History ==
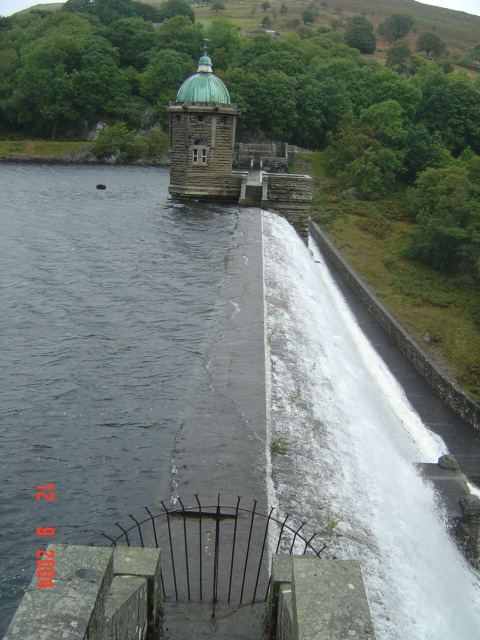
Pen-y-garreg dam, c. 2004.

=== Construction ===
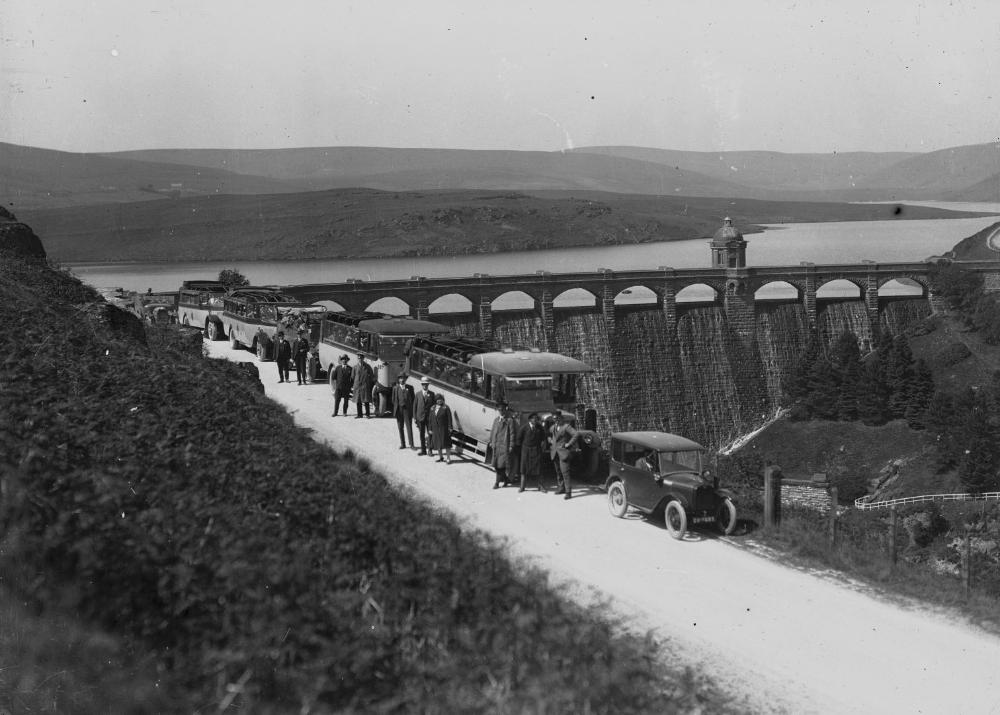
Men and women in buses and cars visiting a reservoir in Elan Valley c. 1910.

The Elan dam scheme was developed in the 19th century following rapid growth of the population of Birmingham due to the Industrial Revolution. The city's expansion resulted in regular outbreaks of water-borne diseases and major epidemics such as typhoid, cholera and dysentery due to the lack of clean water.

Victorian politician Joseph Chamberlain, the leader of Birmingham City Council, began a campaign to get clean water from the Elan and Claerwen valleys in mid Wales. The area, which had been identified by civil engineer James Mansergh, would be ideal for water reservoirs because:

1. it had an average annual rainfall of 1,830 millimetres (72 in).
2. dams could be easily built in the narrow valleys.
3. the bedrock was impermeable to water.
4. there was no need for pumping stations because the reservoirs in Wales would be 52 metres (171 ft) above the water cisterns in Birmingham.

Parliament passed the Birmingham Corporation Water Act 1892 (55 & 56 Vict. c. clxxiii) allowing the Corporation to effect compulsory purchase of the total water catchment area of the Elan and Claerwen valleys (approximately 180 square kilometres (69 sq mi). The act also gave Birmingham Corporation powers to move more than 100 people living in the Elan Valley. All the buildings were demolished; these included three manor houses (two of which had links with the English Romantic poet Percy Bysshe Shelley in 1812), 18 farms, a school and a church (which was replaced with Nantgwyllt Church). Only landowners were given compensation.

Work began to construct the reservoirs the following year in 1893. Construction was overseen by James Mansergh, on behalf of the City of Birmingham's Water Department. Due to the height above sea level of the Elan Valley, water would be fed to Birmingham along a 116-kilometre (72 mi) pipeline that employed a gravity feed with a gradient of 1 in 2,300. The schedule for the project was to build the four lower Elan Valley dams first. The Claerwen would then be built later (work was expected to begin in 1939 but was delayed by the Second World War; it was completed in 1952).

==== Mineral railway ====
The Elan Valley Railway, which was a standard-gauge line, was built by Birmingham Corporation especially for the project. It ran through the Elan Valley from a junction near Rhayader on the Mid-Wales Railway. The first section to be built was a 4-kilometre (2.5 mi) branch from the main line at Rhayader to the main work site at the Caban-coch dam. This depot included a cement cooling shed, general stores, coal storage, workshops for carpenters, smiths, fitters and wagon builders, and sawmills. Further branches were eventually built to all the other dam sites. Engines and trucks reached the top of the dams on wooden trestle scaffolds supported by concrete parapets. The line went as far as the site where the foundations of the Dol-y-mynach dam were being built (lower down the valley from the later Claerwen dam). At its height, the railway had a total length of 45 kilometres (28 mi) with six locomotives transporting up to 1,000 tons of materials a day. Following the completion of the lower dams, the entire Elan Valley Railway had been entirely lifted by 1916. Road transport was used when the Claerwen dam was built in the late 1940s and 1950s.

The railway was required because the core of the Caban-coch, Pen-y-garreg and Craig-goch dams were built from large irregular stone blocks ("plums") embedded in concrete. The rock was mined locally from Cigfran and Craig-cnwch quarries by the Elan River and the Aberdeuddwr quarry on Cerrig Gwynion, just to the south of Rhayader. The shaped stones were hauled by locomotive to the dam sites on flatbed trucks. They were then lowered into place by steam crane. The central cores of the dams were encased with a 2-metre (6 ft 7 in) concrete lining. The outside walls were faced with cut stone brought from quarries at Llanelwedd near Builth Wells and Pontypridd. The cement, which was made near Chatham in Kent, was sent by sea to Aberystwyth and brought by railway to the Elan Valley.

The cost of the Elan valley scheme ran over budget because of the failure to find suitable building stone near any of the dams apart from Caban-coch, as well as the necessity of bringing in facing stone from other quarries in mid and south Wales.

==== Workers' village ====
During the ten-year project to build the Elan Valley dams, the navvies lived in a village of wooden huts near the site. This settlement, which was strictly controlled to keep order and health, would eventually become Elan Village (see Elan Valley). Guards controlled access in and out; this was done to reduce illness and to stop liquor smuggling. All new workers were deloused and examined for infectious diseases before being admitted. To keep order, a man and his wife shared a terrace house with eight single men. A school was provided for under-11-year-olds, who were expected to work on attaining that age. The camp also had a hospital for injuries, an isolation hospital for infectious cases, and a bath house. Men were allowed to drink beer at a pub, though women were not. Other facilities included a library, public hall, shop and canteen.

==== Hydro-electricity ====
Electric street lighting in the construction village was powered by hydroelectric generators. A century later, small-scale hydro-generation was again introduced as a by-product of some of the Elan Valley reservoirs. As of 2013, a renewable-energy firm, Infinis, is operating five water turbines in the district with a combined capacity of about 4 MW.

==== Opening and later progress ====
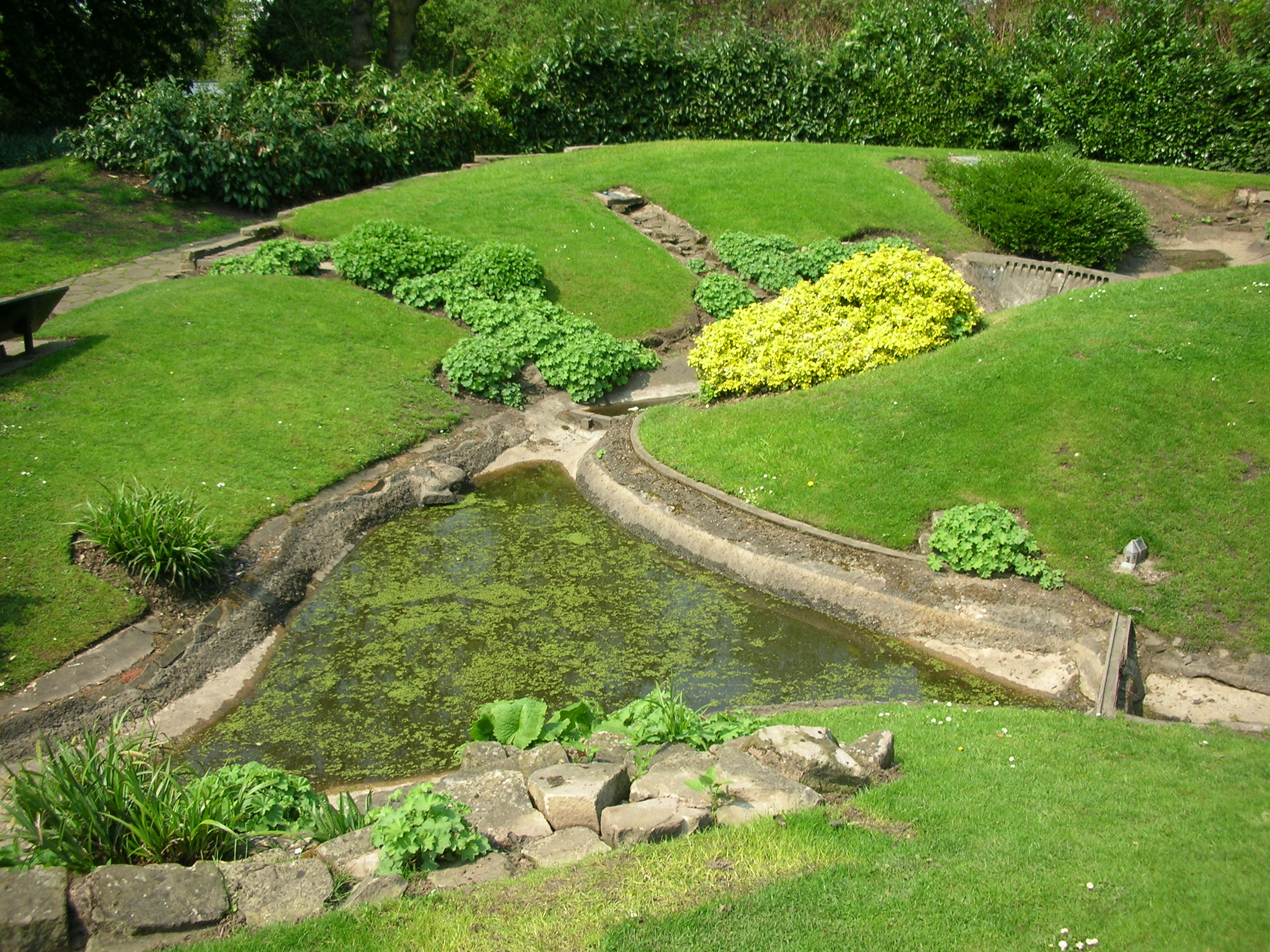
Part of the model in Cannon Hill Park in Birmingham.

The project to supply water to Birmingham was officially opened by King Edward VII and Queen Alexandra on 21 July 1904. As the first four dams provided enough drinking water to meet Birmingham's needs in the early 20th century, it was proposed not to proceed with the damming of the River Claerwen at Dol-y-mynach, Ciloerwynt and Pant-y-beddau until the 1930s.

However, that phase of construction was postponed due to the outbreak of the Second World War. It was not until 1946 that work began on damming the Claerwen. Plans to build the Dol-y-mynach, Ciloerwynt and Pant-y-beddau dams were dropped because of improvements in civil engineering and materials. Instead, work began on a single, much larger, concrete dam higher up the valley. As its designers wanted the Claerwen dam to visually match the earlier dams in the Elan Valley, Italian stonemasons were contracted to decorate the facade in a mock Victorian ashlar. Queen Elizabeth II officially opened Claerwen Reservoir in 1952 in one of her first engagements as monarch.

A scale model of the reservoir network, in the form of ornamental ponds, is located in Cannon Hill Park in Birmingham.

=== Dambusters ===
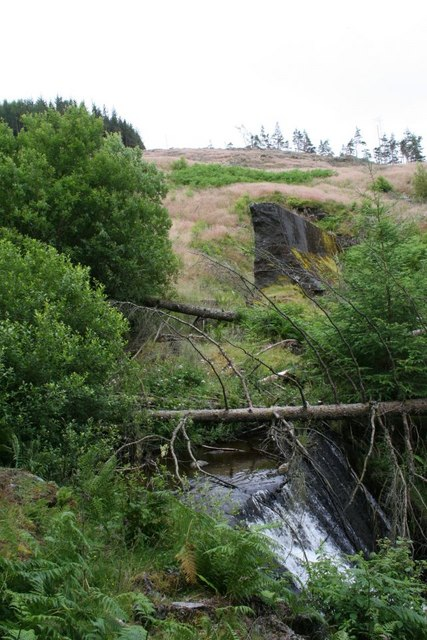
Remains of the breached Nant-y-Gro dam as seen in 2008.

In 1942, the Nant-y-Gro dam, which had been originally built to provide water for the navvies' village, was used by Barnes Wallis to prove his theory that an underwater explosion could create sufficient hydrostatic pressure to collapse a dam wall. The test proved successful as a significant breach in the middle of the 11-metre (36 ft) dam wall was caused by a charge placed at its base.

The lessons learned at Nant-y-Gro green lit the development of the "Upkeep" bouncing bombs. They were used in the 1943 Dambusters Raid when RAF Bomber Command breached and damaged several dams in the Ruhr Valley, Germany.

The remains of the breached Nant-y-Gro dam are in much the same state as it was left in 1942, although partly obscured by trees.

After the Dambusters Raid, steel cables were strung across the valley above the Caban-coch reservoir as a precautionary measure against German reprisals.

=== Aborted expansion scheme ===
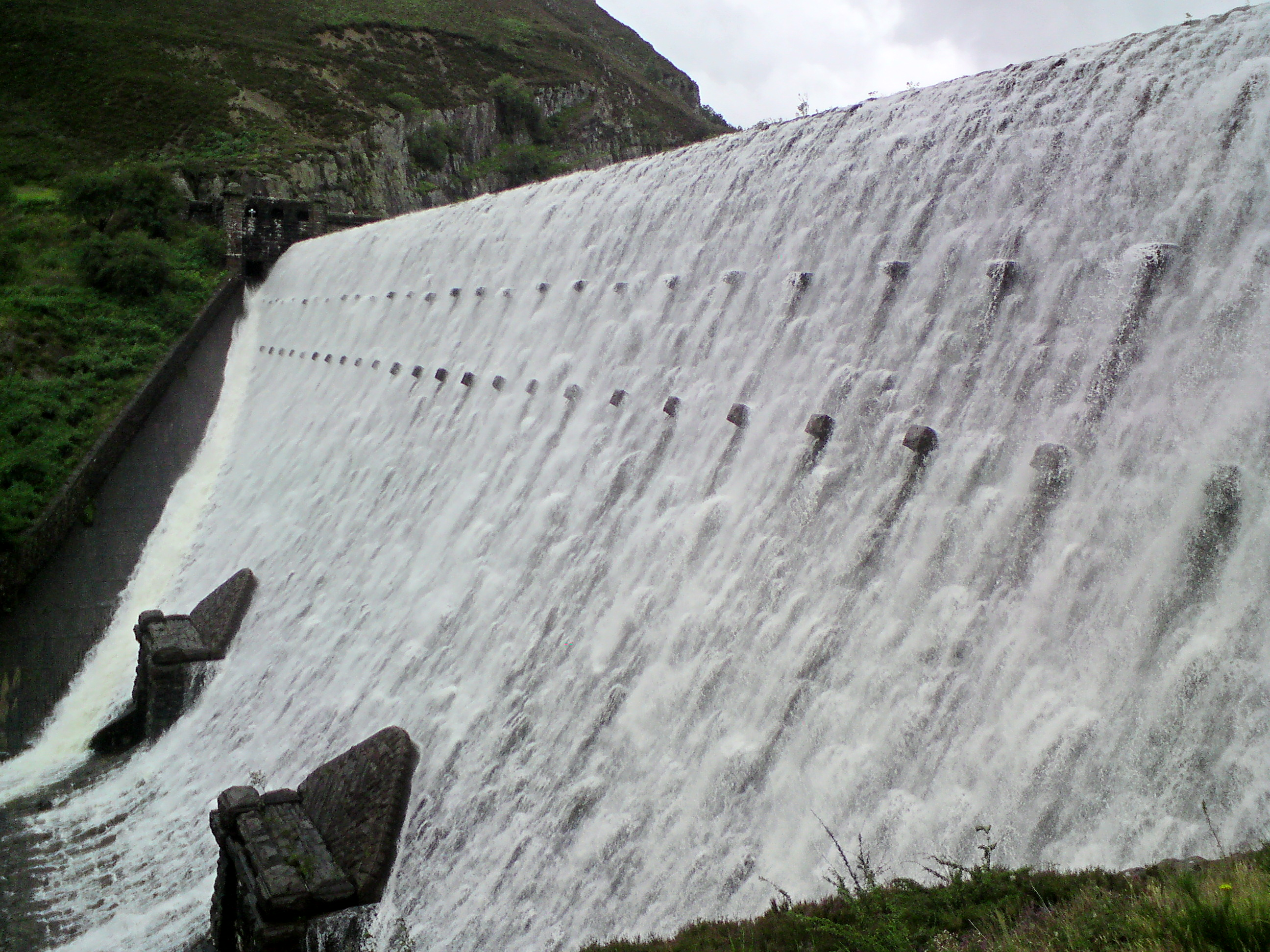
Caban-coch dam, summer 2009.

In the early 1970s, it was proposed that the Craig-goch reservoir should be substantially increased in size with a new and higher downstream dam together with another dam to the north-west, impounding water that would otherwise have flowed down the Ystwyth valley. This scheme would have created a huge reservoir dwarfing all others in Mid Wales, and flooding miles of wild upland valleys. The proposals were eventually abandoned in the face of reducing projections for industrial water demand and an increasing awareness of the environmental issues that such an expansion might create.

== In popular culture ==
- Francis Brett Young researched the Elan Valley as the basis for his novel The House under the Water [Heinemann, 1932] imagining how the scene may have appeared in 1887.
- Elizabeth Clarke wrote The Valley (published by Faber & Faber, 1969) an account of Welsh hill farming life in the valley between the two main periods of construction. Many references are made to the dams, as well as an account of the later enquiry from the hill farmers' point of view.

== See also ==
- Reservoirs and dams in the United Kingdom
