= Verde (building) =

Coordinates: 51.4982°N 0.1425°W

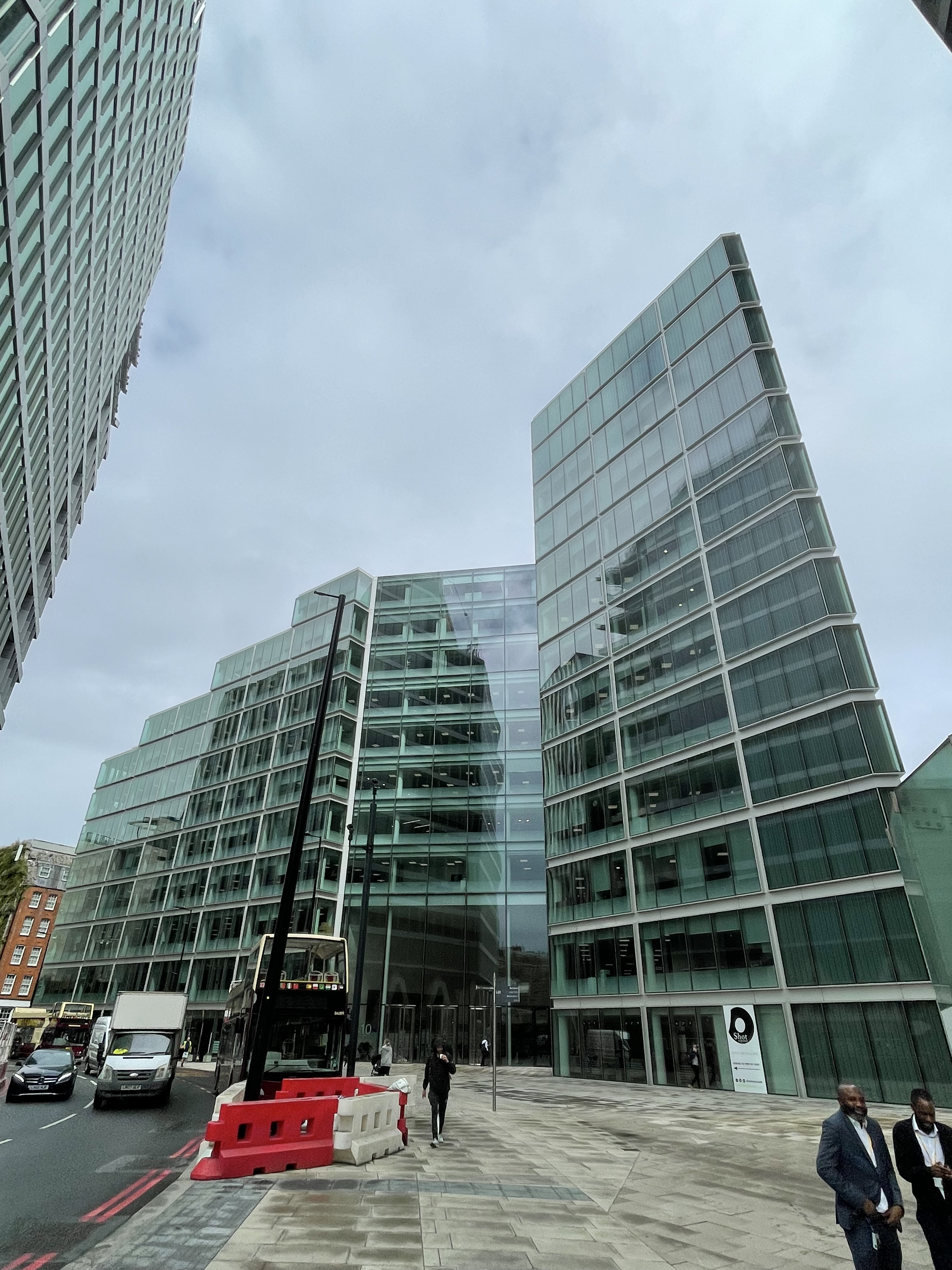
Verde Building after the redevelopment

Eland House prior to the redevelopment

Verde is an office building at 10 Bressenden Place, formerly known as Eland House, in Westminster, London. It was originally designed by EPR Architects and built by Mowlem for Landsec, and although finally completed in 1998, staff of the former Department of the Environment had moved in during late 1995/early 1996.

In 2012, the building was acquired by Tishman Speyer and redeveloped according to a design created by Aukett Swanke. It was then renamed Verde. The redeveloped building encompasses 282,000 square feet of office space across 10 floors, and includes a number of roof gardens.
