= Elan (snowmobile) =

Skidoo snowmobile

Élan
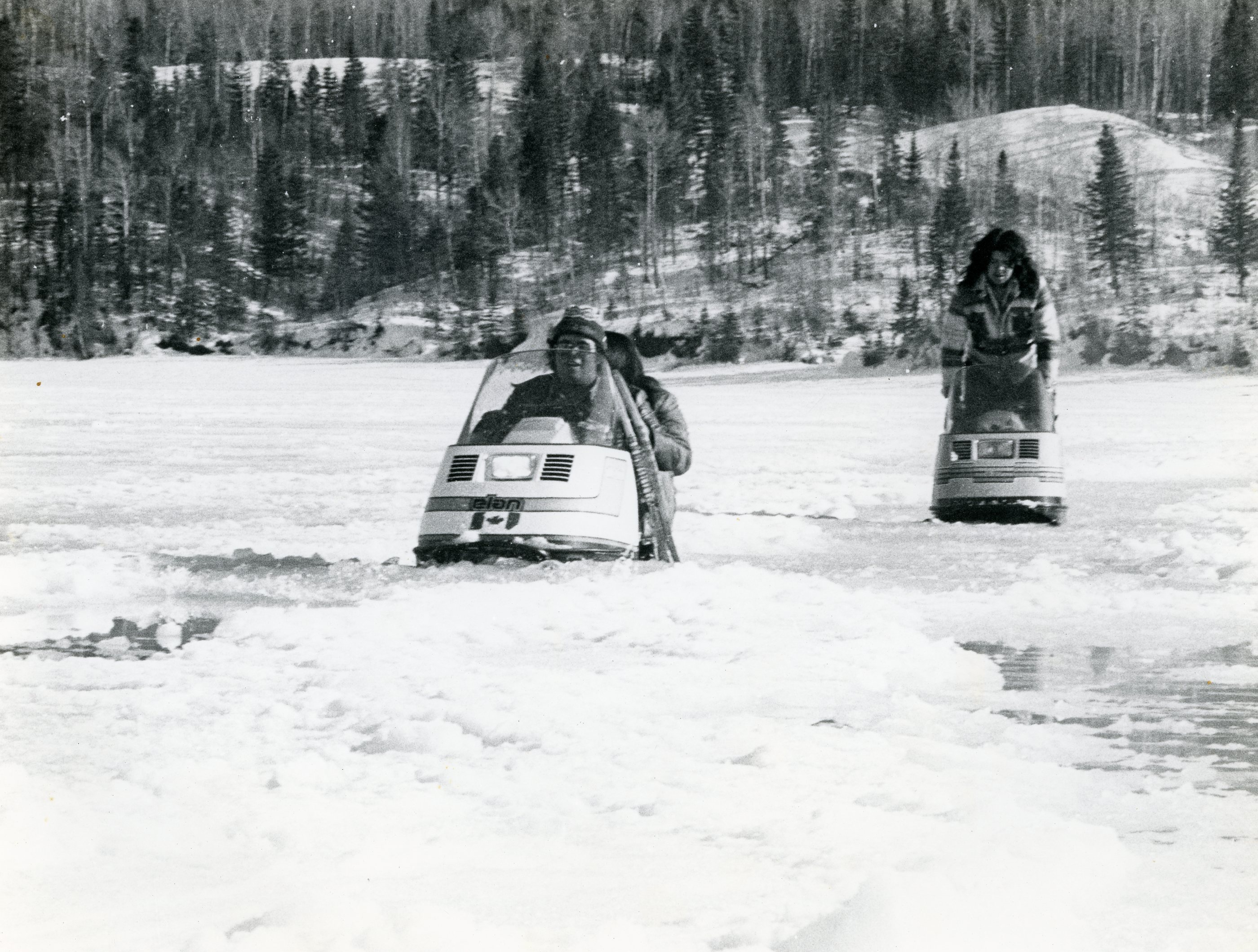
- Manufacturer: Bombardier
- Also called: Elan
- Production: 1971–1996
- Predecessor: Skidoo Olympique
- Successor: Skidoo Tundra
- Engine: Air-cooled 250 cc (15 cu in) 300 cc (18 cu in)
- Bore / stroke: single cyl. 250 69 mm × 66 mm (2.7 in × 2.6 in); twin 250cc 54 mm × 54 mm (2.1 in × 2.1 in); twin 300cc 57 mm × 57.5 mm (2.24 in × 2.26 in)
- Power: 15 kW (20 hp)
- Transmission: Chain drive
- Frame type: Stamped Steel
- Suspension: Bogie, 300- slide
- Brakes: Drum
- Dimensions: L: 88.5"; W: 30"; H: 43"
- Weight: 285lb, 330lb (dry)
- Fuel capacity: 16 L (4.2 US gal)

The Élan was a popular snowmobile variant of Ski-Doo built by Bombardier from 1971 to 1996. They were offered a rather large variety of options, including 1 or 2-cylinder engines, different designs on the hood, and other choices. In 1971, the Élan originally came with Rotax engines - a 247cc single-cylinder two-stroke rated at 12 hp, which had the options of an electric or a recoil starter. In 1973, Bombardier introduced two new 247cc twin-cylinder engines, the standard model rated at 16 hp with a standard muffler and a single Tillotson HR-series carburetor, and the SS model rated at 22 hp with dual HR carburetors, tuned exhaust pipes, disc brake, and a new chrome bumper as standard.

Because of its basic, cheap design, the Élan was long popular with hunters, trappers, and those living in the far north, where certain repair parts (such as a CDI) for other newer sleds could fail, would be harder to obtain, and could leave their riders stranded.

The Élan snowmobile was used in Antarctica at McMurdo Station.

== Engine specifications ==
- 250 single - Rotax 247. 246,8 cc. 69x66 mm. 12 hp
- 292 SS - Rotax single cylinder 292 cc.
- 250 E (same as 250, but with electric start)
- 250 SS - 247,3 cc 54x54 mm. twin cylinder with dual HR carbs 22 hp
- 250 Twin - 247,3 cc. 54x54 mm. Two cylinders.16 hp.
- 250 Deluxe - 247,3 cc. 54x54 mm. Two cylinders and electric start 16 hp.
- 300 SS - 293,3 cc. 57x57,5 mm. Two cylinders. In 1974 increased engine size from 250 to 294 cc and 26 hp
