= Elam, Dallas =

Coordinates: 32.717°N 96.683°W

Elam or Elam Station is a settlement in Southeast Dallas, Texas, United States, which was first settled in 1881 and acquired a post office April 9, 1884 with the name of Elam Station. On September 7, 1899, the name was changed to Elam. The Post Office continued to function until March 15, 1904, when mail was serviced by Rylie.

The area was annexed to Dallas in 1959.

Noted for its skating rink (Twilight Time Skating Palace), Bowling Alley (Buckner Bowl), and Crawford Park. it is now host to the new 75227 Post Office and Dart Station.
