= Craig Goch Dam =

Dam in Elan Valley, Wales

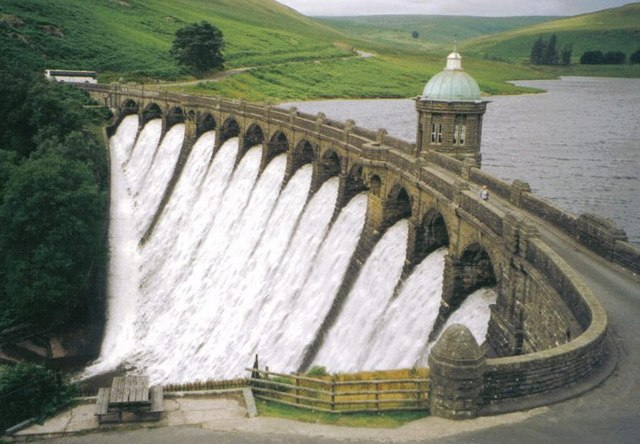

- Location of dam in Wales
- Coordinates: 52°18′17″N 03°37′26″W
- Construction began: 1897
- Opening date: 1904

Dam and spillways
- Height: 120 ft (37 m)
- Length: 390 ft (119 m)
- Width (base): 104 ft (32 m)
- Dam volume: 80,000 yd^{3} (61,164 m^{3})

Reservoir
- Creates: Craig Goch Reservoir
- Total capacity: 6,137 acre⋅ft (7,569,878 m^{3})
- Surface area: 217 acres (1 km^{2})

Power Station
- Commission date: 1997
- Turbines: 1 x Francis-type
- Installed capacity: 480 kW

The Craig Goch Dam, often called the Top dam, is a masonry dam in the Elan Valley of Wales and creates the upper-most of the Elan Valley Reservoirs. Construction on the dam began in 1897, and it was completed in 1904. The primary purpose of the dam and the other reservoirs is to supply Birmingham with water. In 1997, a 480 kW hydroelectric generator began operation at the dam.

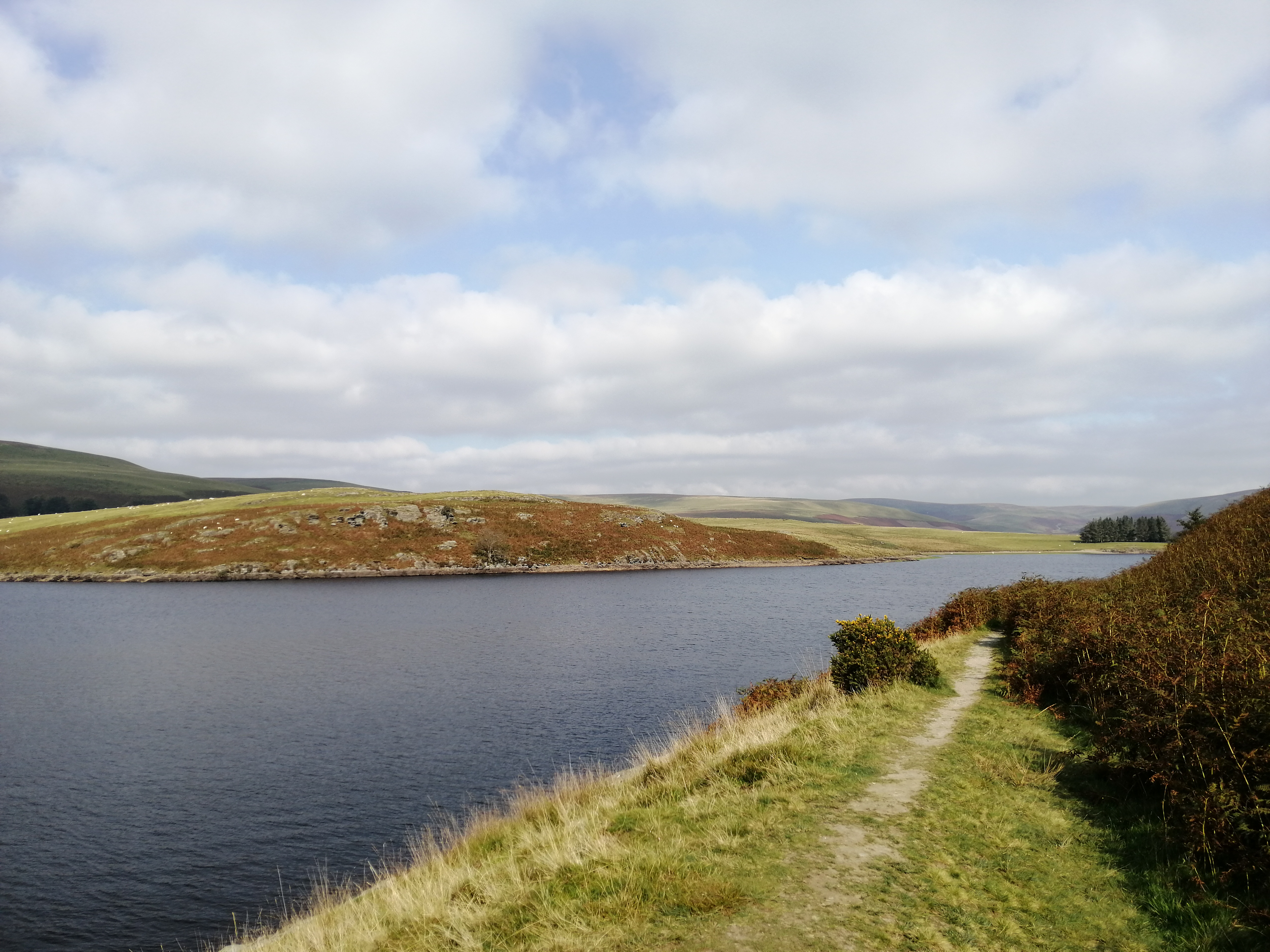

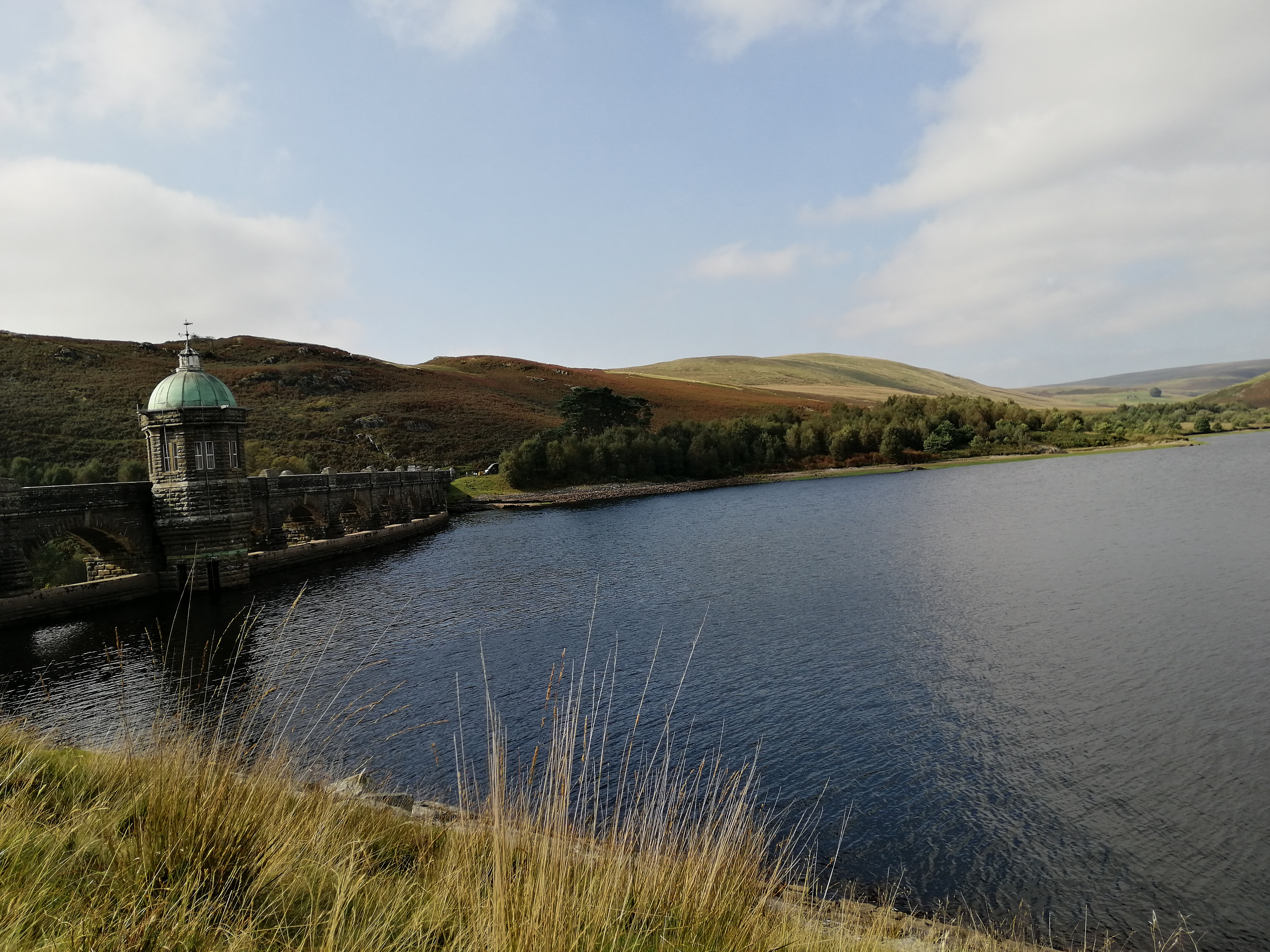

== Potential river transfer scheme ==
The Craig Goch reservoir had been identified in the 1970s and in the 1990s as a potential source of water for the south-east of England. The latest project envisaged raising the existing dam, adding a secondary dam at the head of the River Ystwyth valley and piping water from the high head generated into the River Severn and subsequently transferring it by pipeline aqueduct to the head-waters of the River Thames in the Cotswolds.

== Media appearances ==
Craig Goch Dam was featured prominently in Episode 3 Series 3 of BBC Wales drama series Hinterland, broadcast 2017. It was also John Berry's cover image for the 1969 Ladybird book, ‘Public Services: Water Supply’.
