= Elan Valley =

Valley in mid Wales

Coordinates: 52°15′44″N 3°35′19″W

- Cwm Elan
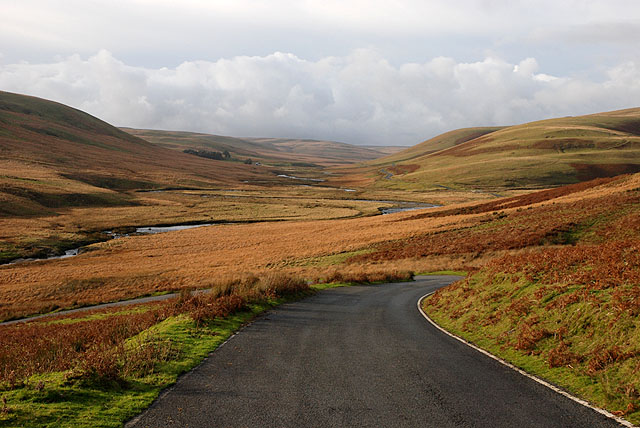
- View of the Elan Valley, looking southwards towards Craig Goch Reservoir.
- Area: 70 sq mi (180 km^{2})

Geology
- Type: River valley, partially dammed to form the Elan Valley Reservoirs

Geography
- Population centers: Elan Village
- Rivers: Afon Elan
- Interactive map of Elan Valley

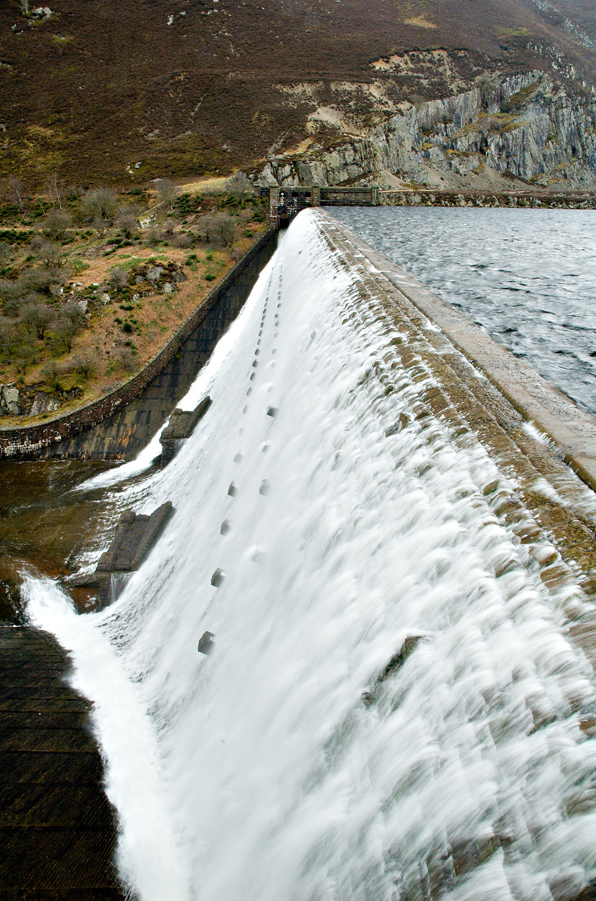
Caban Coch Dam

The Elan Valley (Welsh: Cwm Elan) is a river valley situated to the west of Rhayader, in Powys, Wales, sometimes known as the "Welsh Lake District". It covers 70 square miles (180 km^{2}) of lake and countryside.

The valley contains the Elan Valley Reservoirs and Elan Village, designed by architect Herbert Tudor Buckland as part of the same scheme. Elan Village is the only purpose-built Arts and Crafts "Model Village" in Wales.

The area is known for its scenery, and over 80% of the valley is designated as Sites of Special Scientific Interest. A cycle trail, the Elan Valley Trail, makes a loop from Rhayader around the reservoirs. Part of the cycle trail overlaps with a spur of National Cycle Route 81 (Lon Cambria).

As of 2015 it is an International Dark Sky Park.

== See also ==
- Elan Valley Reservoirs
- Elan Valley aqueduct
- Elan Valley Railway
- River Elan
