= Elan Lee Buller =

American basketball player (born 1979)

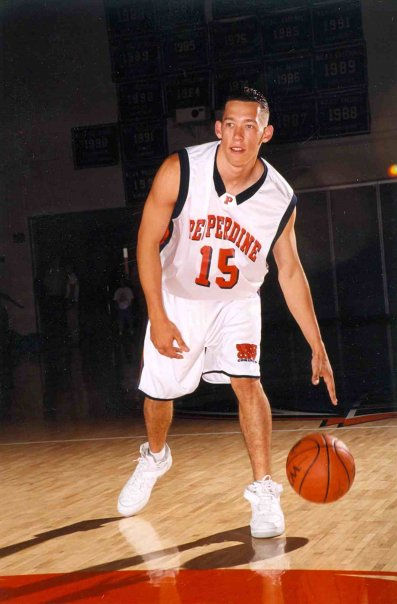

Personal information
- Born: February 16, 1979 (age 47) Los Angeles, California, U.S.
- Listed height: 6 ft 0 in (1.83 m)
- Listed weight: 170 lb (77 kg)

Career information
- High school: El Camino Real (Los Angeles, California)
- College: Pepperdine (2000–2001)
- Position: Point guard

Elan Lee Buller (born February 16, 1979) is an American former basketball player for the Pepperdine University Waves in Malibu, California. He won a gold medal at the Maccabiah Games (July 2001) in Israel and broke two Guinness World Records for the longest basketball shot from the ground.

== Early life and college career ==
Buller grew up in Los Angeles, California and played the point guard position for the El Camino Real High School Varsity basketball team. He scored a school record of 47 points in a game against Granada Hills High School. Based on his high school academic and athletic record, he earned several athletic scholarships and played for Bethel College (Newton, Kansas), Fresno Pacific University (Fresno, California), and Pepperdine University (Los Angeles, California). At Pepperdine University, he played point guard from 1999 to 2001. In the 1999/2000 season, Buller was part of the team (as a redshirt) that beat the Indiana Hoosiers, then coached by Bobby Knight, in the first round of the NCAA Tournament. Buller also appeared in an Adidas commercial as a basketball player.

In July, 2001, Buller played on the United States basketball team that won a gold medal at the Maccabiah Games.

== World records ==
Buller set two Guinness World Records for the longest basketball shot made from the ground level. His first record was achieved on his birthday in 2011 at Campbell Hall Elementary school in Studio City, California. The shot was measured at 104 feet 7 inches (31.88 m). His second Guinness World record for longest basketball shot was set on September 9, 2014. The shot was measured at 112 feet 6 inches (34.29 meters) and took place in Oak Park, California. This shot broke Harlem Globetrotter Corey “Thunder” Law's record of 109 feet 9 inches (33.45 m).

== Accomplishments and awards ==
- All-City High School Basketball Player in Los Angeles, California
- Guinness World Records for longest ground level basketball shot (videos of both shots are in the external links below)
- Gold medal at the Maccabiah Games (July 2001)
- Honored for Maccabiah U.S. Gold Medal at the Los Angeles Chapter of ORT (December 9, 2001), Beverly Hilton Hotel, Beverly Hills, California
- Pepperdine University, Bachelor of Science & Bachelor of Arts (2002)

== Personal life ==
Elan Buller has two brothers, Erick Joshua Buller (BA, UC, Santa Barbara) and Michael Joseph Buller (BA, CSU, Northridge), and is the son of Vern E. Buller and Ronit Buller of Woodland Hills, California. Elan Buller is a Camp Director, Coach, and Teacher at Campbell Hall School in Studio City, California. He lives in Calabasas, California and is married to Joy (Mason) Buller who is a CPA/Partner in her firm. They have two sons, Bradyn Asher Buller (born January 3, 2018) and Aaron Jordan Buller (born May 14, 2021).
