= Elan Village =

Village in Powys, Wales

Coordinates: 52.2737°N 3.5654°W

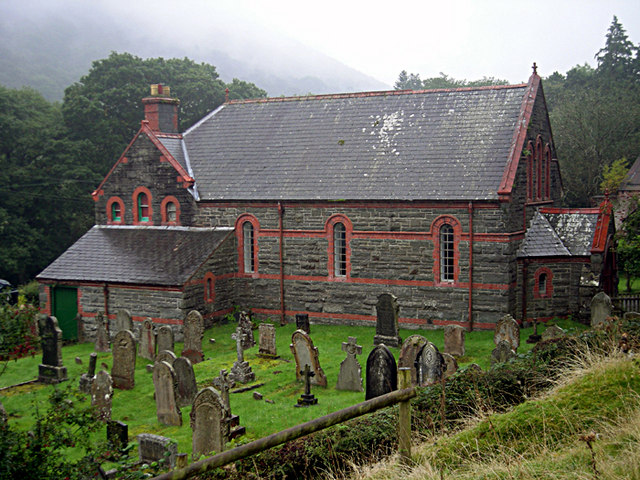
Elan Village chapel

Elan Village (Welsh: Pentre Elan) is a small purpose-built community in Powys, Wales. It was designed by architect Herbert Tudor Buckland as part of Birmingham Corporation's scheme to construct a series of water supply reservoirs in the Elan Valley between 1892 and 1904. It housed workers and their families responsible for maintaining the scheme's dams and the filtration systems. Elan Village is the only purpose-built Arts and Crafts "model village" in Wales.

It is served by the B4518 road which runs three miles southwestwards from Rhayader to end at the village, though continuing as a minor road to Caban-coch reservoir. The road continues over the Elenydd to Cwmystwyth and a cul-de-sac branch runs to the dam of Claerwen reservoir. It is in the community of Rhayader.
