= Ronald Eland =

Canadian commercial helicopter pilot

Ronald Allen Eland, CM OBC is a Canadian commercial helicopter pilot. He is a "pioneer in the development of high altitude winch rescue and mountain flying techniques". He is Canada's first commercial helicopter pilot who was not previously a fixed-wing pilot.

In 1993, he was made a Member of the Order of Canada. In 1992, he was awarded the Order of British Columbia.

Most of his career was spent working for Trans North Helicopters in Haines Junction, Yukon where he performed many rescues of injured and lost mountain climbers in Kluane National Park, especially at Canada's highest mountain, Mount Logan.
