= Elan Vital =

Elan Vital may refer to:

- Élan vital, translated as "vital impetus" or "vital force", a philosophical term coined by Henri Bergson
- Elan Vital (organization), an American religious organization
- Élan Vital (album), a 2006 album by Pretty Girls Make Graves
- Elan Vital, a fictional character in the anime television series Melody of Oblivion
