= John Eland (chemist) =

British chemist

John Hugh David Eland FRS (born 6 August 1941) is a British chemist, and Fellow of Worcester College, Oxford.

Eland was educated at St John's School, Leatherhead and University College, Oxford. He is the son of Rev. Thomas Eland and Verna Prosser Eland (née Reynolds).

He is the research group supervisor of the Eland group.

== Works ==
- Double ionisation of ICN and BrCN studied by a new photoelectron–photoion coincidence technique, Chemical Physics, Volume 327, Issue 1, 21 August 2006
- Single and multiple photoionisation of H2S by 40–250 eV photons, Physical Chemistry Chemical Physics, Issue 41, 2011
