= Élan, Ardennes =

Élan
- Part of Flize
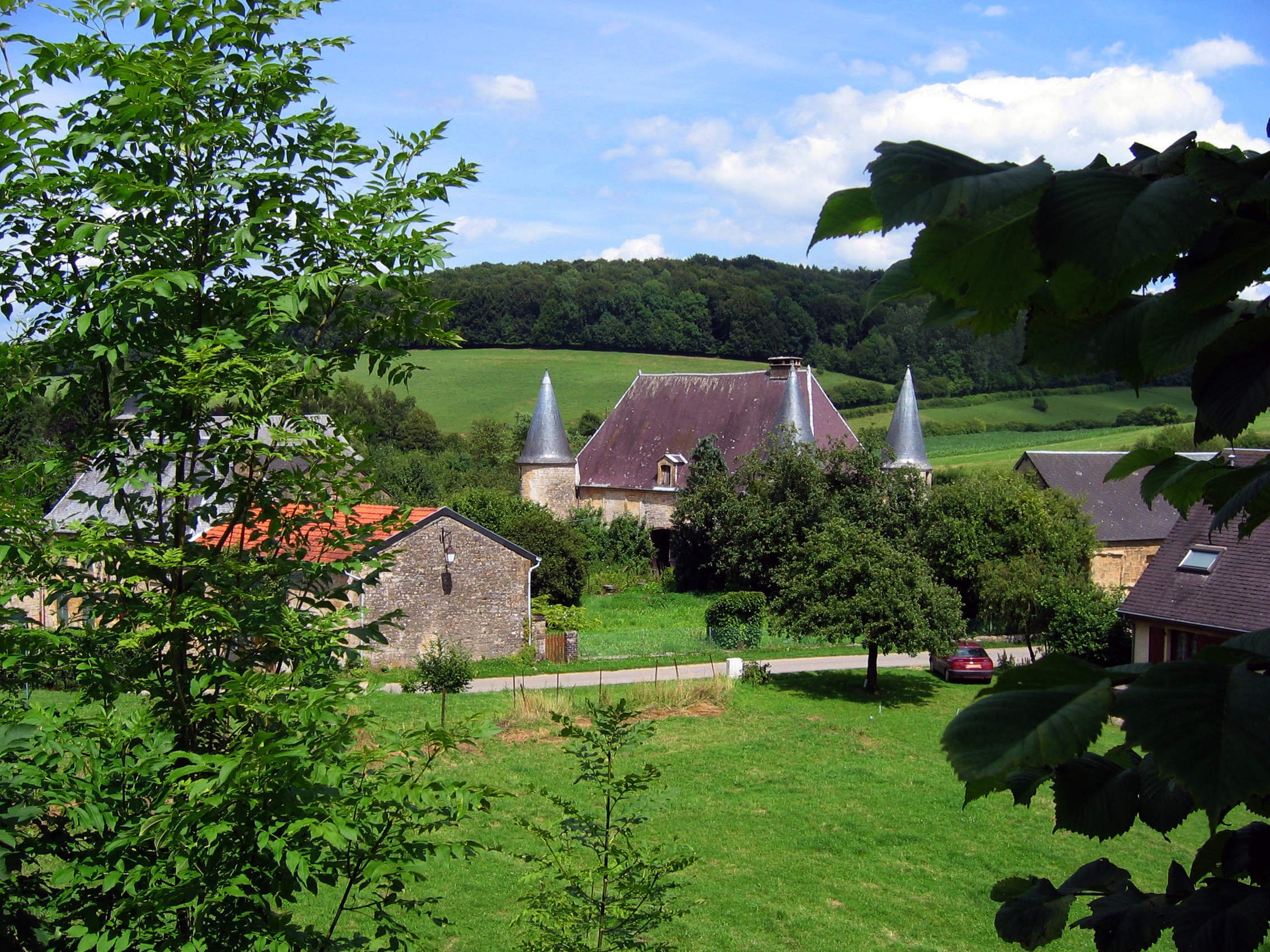
- Abbot's palace

- Coat of arms
- Location of Élan
- Location within France Location within Grand Est
- Coordinates: 49°39′52″N 4°45′23″E
- Country: France
- Region: Grand Est
- Department: Ardennes
- Arrondissement: Charleville-Mézières
- Canton: Nouvion-sur-Meuse
- Commune: Flize
- Area^{1}: 9.86 km^{2} (3.81 sq mi)
- Elevation: 240 m (790 ft)
- Population (2023): 86
  - Density: 8.7/km^{2} (23/sq mi)
- Time zone: UTC+01:00 (CET)
  - Summer (DST): UTC+02:00 (CEST)
- Postal code: 08160
- ^{1} French Land Register data, which excludes lakes, ponds, glaciers > 1 km^{2} (0.386 sq mi or 247 acres) and river estuaries.

Élan (French pronunciation: [elɑ̃]) is a former commune in the Ardennes department in the Grand Est region in northern France. On 1 January 2019, it was merged into the commune Flize.

The commune was the home of Élan Abbey, founded in the 12th century by Roger of Ellant.

== Sights ==
- Arboretum d'Élan

== See also ==
- Communes of the Ardennes department
