= Llan =

Llan may be:

- Llan (placename), a Celtic morpheme, or element, common in British placenames
  - A short form for any placename.
- Llan, Powys, a Welsh village near Llanbrynmair
- Llan the Sorcerer, a fictional character in Marvel Comics
