= Elan (magazine) =

Elan the magazine is an online lifestyle publication, focused on global youth culture, sharing the stories of remarkable young professionals empowering their communities, enlightening their peers and inspiring those around them. Covering a variety of topics from business and architecture to fashion and culture, Elan also includes inspiring profiles of prominent voices around the world. Based in New York City, the online publication has more than 3,000,000 visitors per month and is growing rapidly.

== History ==
Founded in 2008, Elan first appeared in print and then went online in 2009. Elan’s strives to cover global culture in a way that has not been done before. By highlighting the community in regards to culture, business, travel, humor, high profile people, and mainstream news the publication has succeeded in staying away from stereotypical political issues that tend to drown out these other fascinating stories. Content is youth and forward focused, making it a positive voice about culture and being a modern Muslim in the world today. This unique approach has led the publication to being the dominant voice it is regarded as today.

The name Elan came from its meaning of “announcement” in Persian, Urdu and Arabic. The magazine’s global approach to people from different backgrounds and cultures around the world is one of the founding principles of the publication.

In the Spring of 2011, Elan also introduced a brand new weekly Webcast section featuring global correspondents covering a multitude of topics and thought leaders around the world including US Special Representative Farah Pandith, HRH Princess Rym Ali, and Farooq Kathwari, CEO of Ethan Allen.

== Impact ==
With a goal to increase cross-cultural understanding by highlighting the ideas and perspectives of innovative voices across all fields, Elan covers world culture in a way that has not been done before. Its writers cover various hues of the global spectrum including culture, business, travel, humor, high profile individuals, and mainstream news. The publication has, however, successfully succeeded in staying away from divisive political issues that tend to drown out otherwise fascinating stories. The magazine now focuses on more global issues and continuously expanding with its new tagline “The Voices We Love. The Stories We Live.”

"Elan is very valuable in the media marketplace as a place for the growing group of young, savvy professionals across the world. Serving this ignored, marginalized, or even unrecognized demographic with culturally relevant news and information makes elan essential to a diverse media landscape," said Reza Aslan, author of New York Times best seller No God but God and regular CNN analyst.

Voted as one of the hottest launches by min magazine in 2008, Elan has also had commentary featured in The Huffington Post, Entrepreneur, USA Today and CNN.
