= Boutancourt =

- Part of Flize
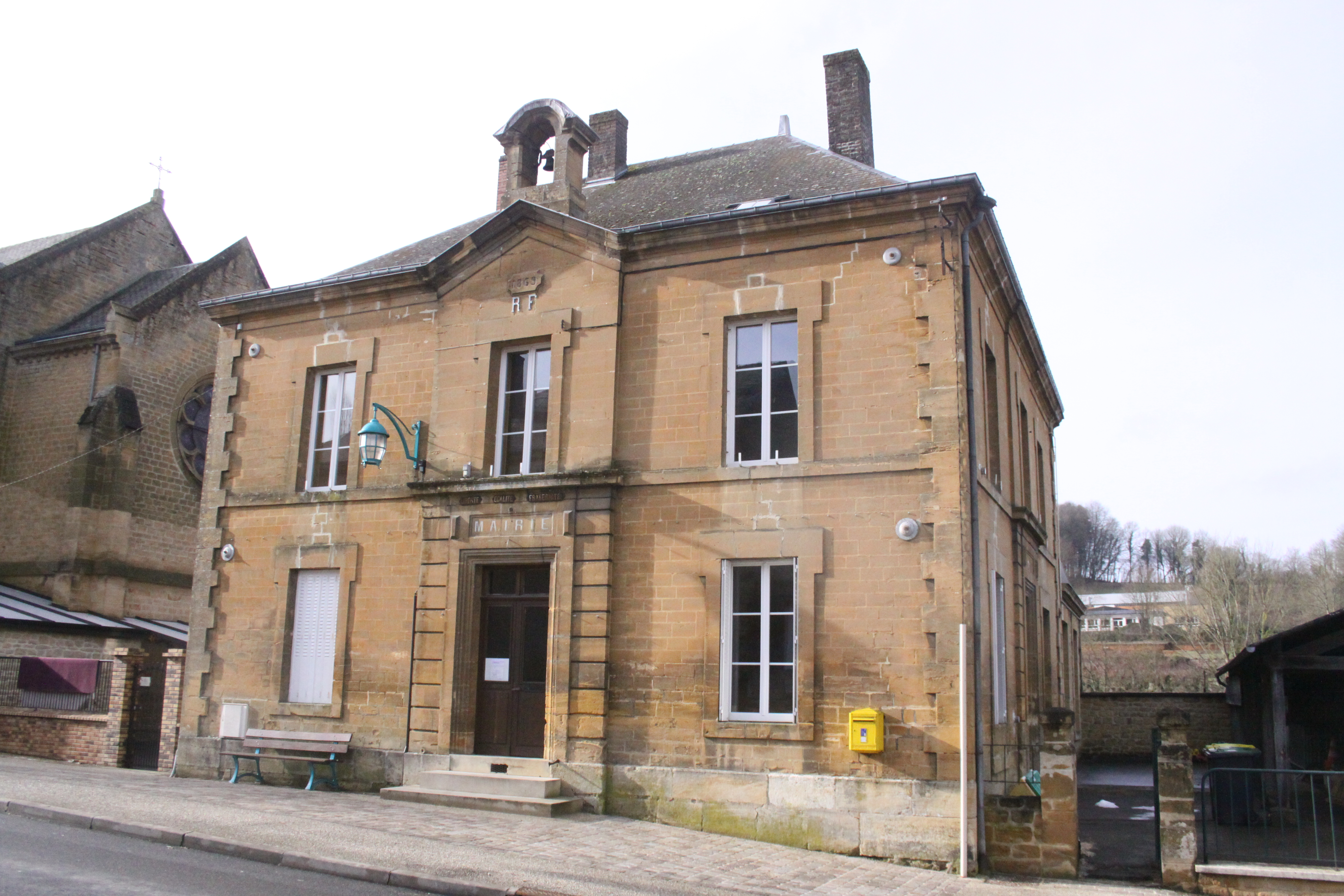
- Town hall
- Location of Boutancourt
- Location within France Location within Grand Est
- Coordinates: 49°41′05″N 4°46′09″E
- Country: France
- Region: Grand Est
- Department: Ardennes
- Arrondissement: Charleville-Mézières
- Canton: Nouvion-sur-Meuse
- Commune: Flize
- Area^{1}: 2.99 km^{2} (1.15 sq mi)
- Elevation: 165 m (541 ft)
- Highest elevation: 276 m (906 ft)
- Lowest elevation: 149 m (489 ft)
- Population (2021): 278
  - Density: 93.0/km^{2} (241/sq mi)
- Time zone: UTC+01:00 (CET)
  - Summer (DST): UTC+02:00 (CEST)
- Postal code: 08160
- ^{1} French Land Register data, which excludes lakes, ponds, glaciers > 1 km^{2} (0.386 sq mi or 247 acres) and river estuaries.

Boutancourt (French pronunciation: [butɑ̃kuʁ]) is a former commune in the Ardennes department and Grand Est region of north-eastern France. On 1 January 2019, it was merged into the commune Flize.

== See also ==
- Communes of the Ardennes department
