= Elaan =

Elaan (lit. 'announcement' or 'proclamation') may refer to these Indian films:

- Elaan (1947 film), a Bollywood film directed by Mehboob Khan
- Elaan (1971 film), a Bollywood thriller film directed by K. Ramanlal
- Elaan (1994 film), a Bollywood film directed by Guddu Dhanoa
- Elaan (2005 film), a Bollywood action thriller film

== See also ==
- Elan (disambiguation)
- Ilan (disambiguation)
