= Instituto Latinoamericano de Museos =

Instituto Latinoamericano de Museos (ILAM), known in English as the Latin American Institute of Museums or the ILAM Foundation is a web portal that provides a wide variety of information relating to museums and parks in countries within Latin America. It was founded in 1997, is based in Costa Rica and the Director is Georgina DeCarli.

The organization's role is to improve best practices around cultural heritage within the region and serves more than 7000 organizations within the region who are not otherwise able to priorize that.
