= Ilan, Fars =

Ilan ايلان
- Village
- Location within Iran
- Coordinates: 29°15′50″N 51°57′17″E
- Country: Iran
- Province: Fars
- County: Kazerun
- Bakhsh: Jereh and Baladeh
- Rural District: Jereh

Population (2006)
  - Total: 591
- Time zone: UTC+3:30 (IRST)
  - Summer (DST): UTC+4:30 (IRDT)

Ilan (Persian: ايلان, also Romanized as Īlān) is a village in Jereh Rural District, Jereh and Baladeh District, Kazerun County, Fars province, Iran. At the 2006 census, its population was 591, in 127 families.
