= Claerwen =

Claerwen Reservoir
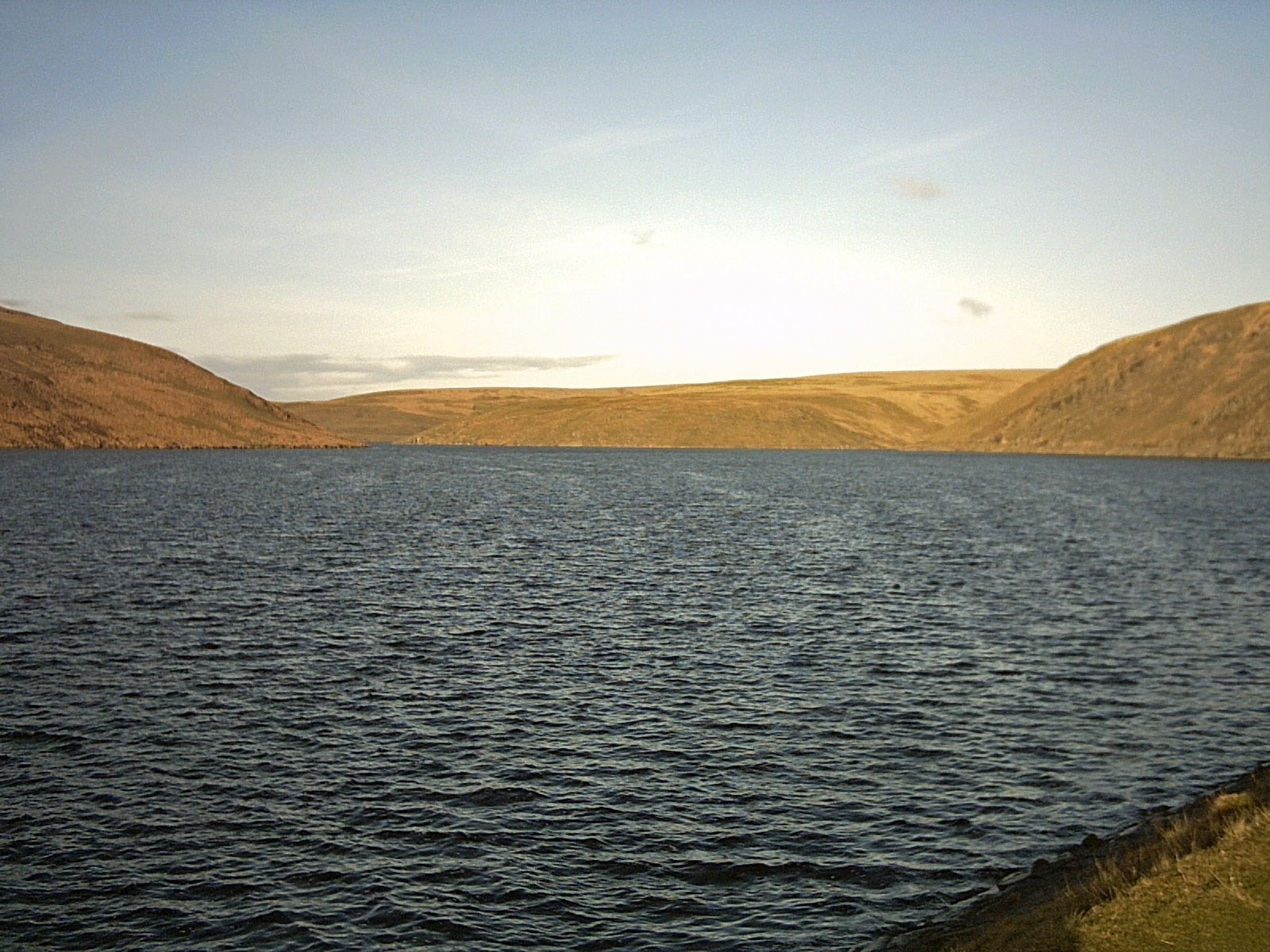

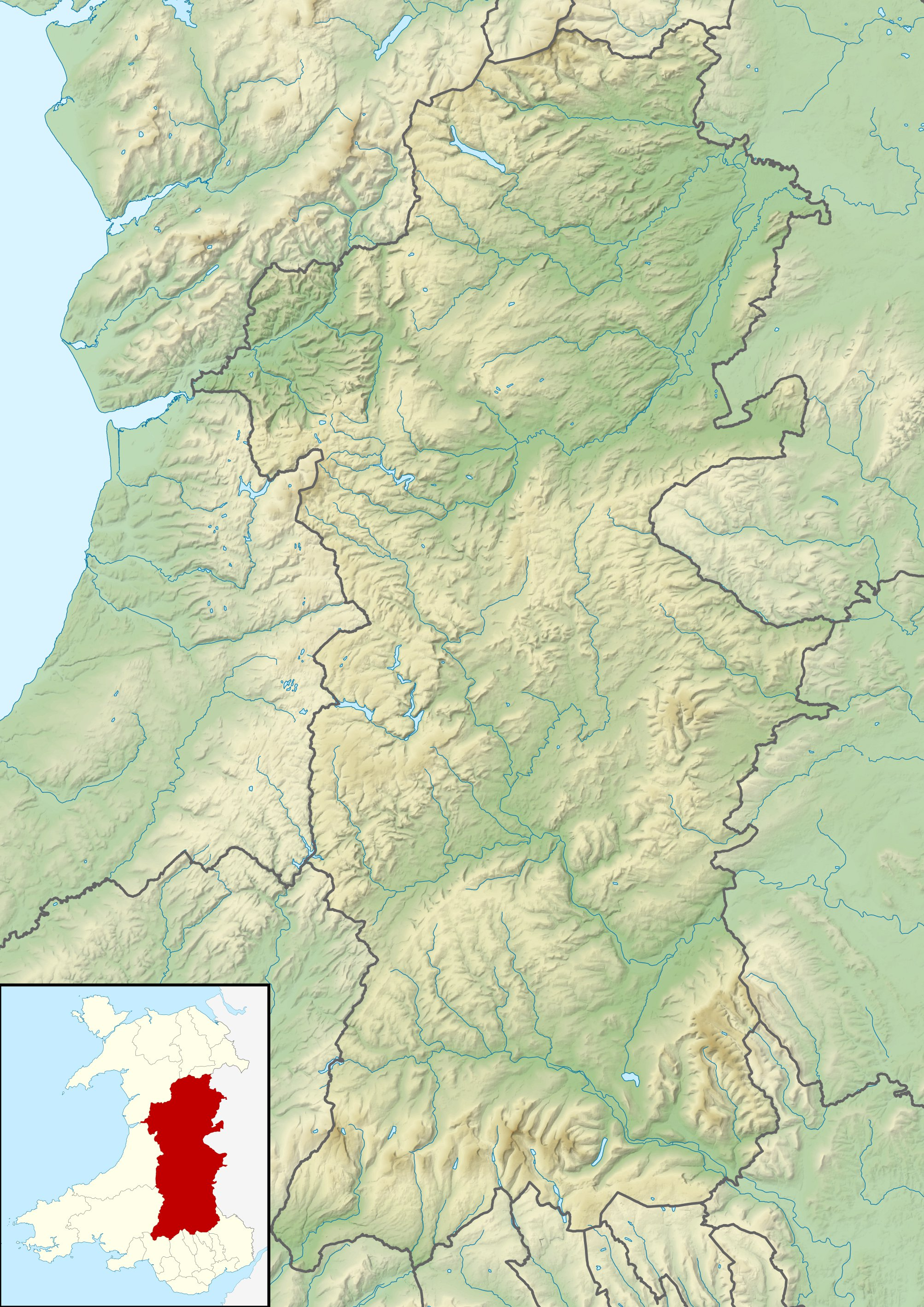
- Location within Powys
- Location: Wales
- Coordinates: 52°16′20″N 3°41′20″W
- Type: Reservoir
- Basin countries: United Kingdom
- Surface area: 3.688 km^{2} (1.424 sq mi)

The Claerwen reservoir and dam in Powys, Wales, were the last additions to the Elan Valley Reservoirs system built to provide water for the increasing water demand of the city of Birmingham and the West Midlands. The dam is built mainly of concrete, with the exterior dam face in dressed stone. The dam is a gravity dam built upon solid rock foundations as the pressure of the reservoir behind should be in equilibrium with the total weight of the dam itself thus causing complete stability.

The Claerwen dam was designed by Sir William Halcrow and Partners and the main contractor was Edmund Nuttall, Sons and Co. (London) Ltd. The dam was finished in 1952 and was given a late Victorian effect so that it blended in with the earlier dams in the valley. It was necessary to employ the services of Italian stonemasons as British ones were still at work in London during the post-war rebuilding process of the late 1940s.

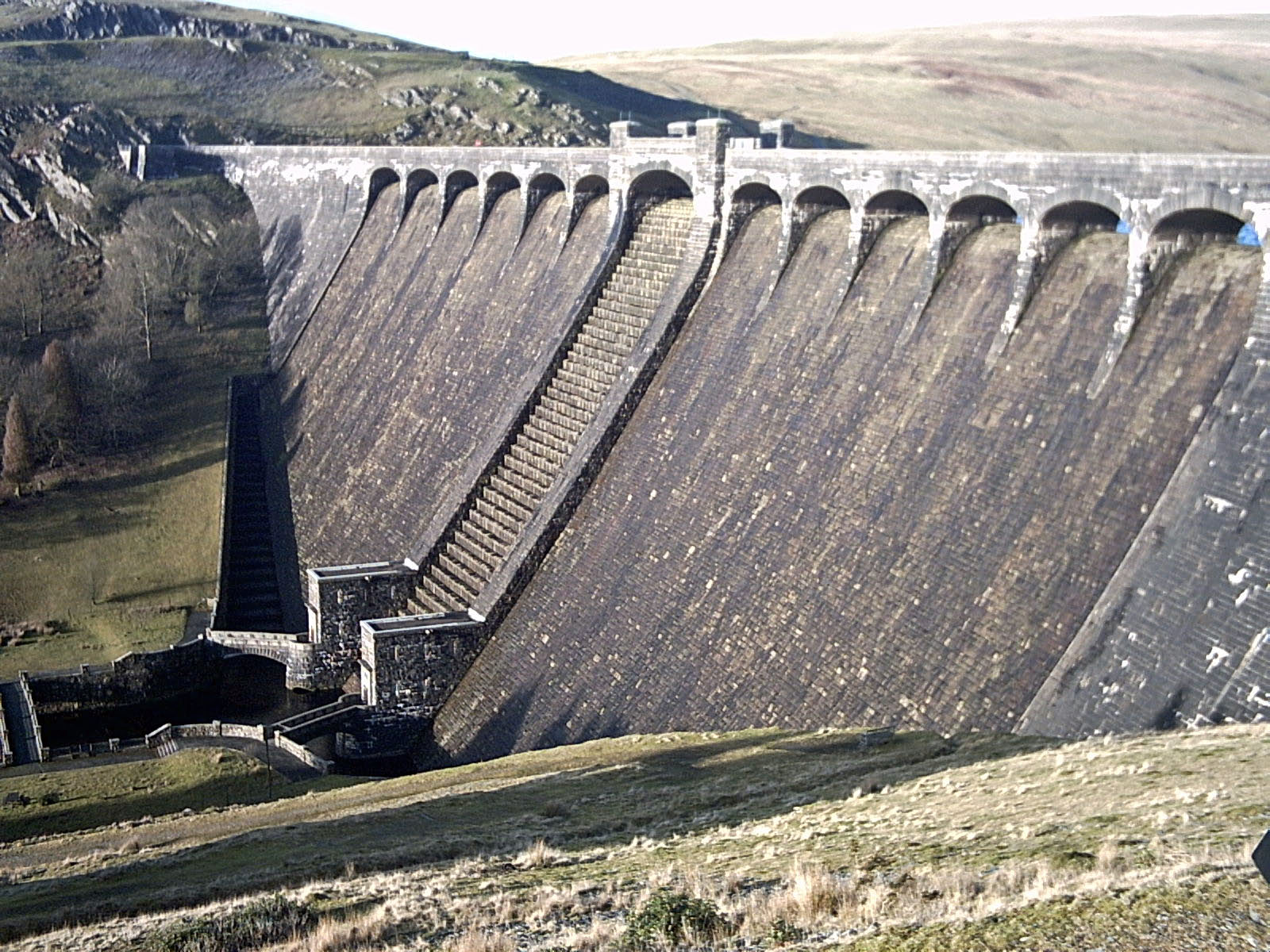
Downstream face of Claerwen Dam

The dam took six years to complete and is almost twice the size of the other dams in the Elan valley. The Claerwen reservoir is almost the size of all the other reservoirs in the Elan Valley system combined. Officially commissioned by Queen Elizabeth II in 1952, it was one of her first royal engagements as monarch.

Water from the reservoir flows via an underground aqueduct to the Caban-coch reservoir from which it is abstracted through a gravity aqueduct to Birmingham.

== Statistics ==
- Height: 56 m (184 ft)
- Length: 355 m (1,165 ft)
- Building material: primarily concrete
- Capacity: 48,300,300 m^{3} (1.06246×10^{10} imp gal)

Some idea of what was involved in the building of the dam is given by the quantities of materials used. Approximately 1¼ million bricks, half a million tons of crushed stone, 200,000 tons of sand, 70,000 tons of cement and 18,500 tons of masonry had to be transported to the site, and an electricity generating station with a capacity of 1,500 horsepower (1120 kW) was installed to provide power to operate the plant. Stone for concrete was obtained from a quarry about three miles (5 km) away. Most of the sand was obtained from the Severn Valley, a distance of over 70 miles (110 km) by road, and the low heat Portland cement used was made at Aberthaw in South Wales, taken to Rhayader station by train in specially-made containers, and carried to the site by a fleet of lorries. About 370 men were employed in building the dam. The contractors, Edmund Nuttall, Sons and Co. (London) Ltd., provided a temporary camp for 200 of them, with bungalows for members of the staff. This was about seven miles (11 km) away and outside the catchment area. Others were accommodated in Rhayader. Local men were among those who took part in the work, and they were transported to the site daily in coaches, in some cases from a distance of 40 miles (64 km).

== Claerwen National Nature Reserve ==
Claerwen National Nature Reserve is an expanse of mountain upland lying halfway between Rhayader in Powys and Pontrhydfendigaid in Ceredigion. The mainly peaty and acidic soil provides an environment which is home for many species of plants and animals which thrive in these conditions. These biomes include several highly oligotrophic lakes and ponds, raised mires and large areas that have seen little or any man-made changes. These include the nationally scarce water plantain (Luronium natans) as well as carnivorous plants such as Drosera rotundifolia, and butterworts. It is a known breeding site for red kite and merlin.

== In popular culture ==
In 2015 the dam was featured in the fourth episode of series twenty-two of the BBC motoring programme Top Gear. During the episode Richard Hammond winched a Land Rover Series I up to the top of the dam, and down again, in mimicry of an advert once used for the vehicle, during a tribute segment for the Land Rover Defender.
