= Elan, Bichursky District, Republic of Buryatia =

Elan Елань
- Selo
- Location within Republic of Buryatia Location within Russia
- Coordinates: 50°32′N 107°20′E
- Country: Russia
- Region: Republic of Buryatia
- District: Bichursky District
- Time zone: UTC+8:00

Elan (Russian: Елань) is a rural locality (a selo) in Bichursky District, Republic of Buryatia, Russia. The population was 1,082 as of 2010. There are 9 streets.

== Geography ==
Elan is located 28 km southwest of Bichura (the district's administrative centre) by road. Khayan is the nearest rural locality.
