= Elam (surname) =

Elam is a surname. Notable people with the surname include:

- Caroline Elam (1945−), British art historian
- Charles Wheaton Elam (1866–1917), Louisiana politician
- Joseph Barton Elam (1821–1885), U.S. representative from Louisiana's 4th congressional district
- Jack Elam (1918–2003), American actor
- James Elam (1918–1995), American physician
- Jason Elam (born 1970), American football player
- Kaiir Elam (born 2001), American football player
- Katrina Elam (born 1983), American country music singer
- Guru (rapper), stage name of Keith Elam (1961–2010), American rapper, one half of the duo Gang Starr
- Lee Elam (born 1976), English footballer
- Norah Elam (1878–1961), Irish-born suffragette and fascist
- Onzy Elam (born 1964), American football player
- Paul Elam, founder of A Voice for Men.
