= Eland Oil & Gas =

UK-based company operating in Nigeria

Eland Oil & Gas PLC
- Company type: Public (AIM: ELA)
- Industry: Oil and Gas
- Founded: 2009
- Headquarters: Aberdeen, Scotland
- Key people: Ian Les Blair (CEO); George Walter Mitchell Maxwell (CFO); Harry Wilson (Chairman)
- Website: www.elandoilandgas.com

Eland Oil & Gas PLC was a Nigeria focused upstream oil and natural gas exploration and production company with operational offices in Abuja, Nigeria and Aberdeen, Scotland.

== History ==
The Company was founded in 2009 with the vision and strategy to become a high growth Nigeria focused independent exploration and production company.

Concurrent with the initial public offering in September 2012, Eland purchased a 45% interest in OML 40, with its partner Starcrest Energy Nigeria Limited, from the Shell Group.

The Nigerian oil business, Seplat Petroleum Development Company, acquired the company in December 2019.

== Operations ==
The focus in 2012/2013 was 1) to restart shut-in production on OML 40 through existing production facilities, 2) to commission a new CPR (Competent Persons Report), and 3) to commence drilling of new development wells through a long-term drilling programme.

=== OML 40 ===
OML 40 has production history, booked developed and undeveloped reserves, infrastructure for production and oil export for 30,000 barrels (4,800 m^{3}) of oil per day comprising a flowstation and an export pipeline.

There is low risk appraisal upside and substantial exploration potential.

The licence area covers 498 km^{2} with gross lease 2P Reserves of 71.5 million barrels (11.4 million cubic metres), gross lease 3P Reserves of 117 million bbl (18.6 million m^{3}), and gross lease 2C Contingent Resources of 15.5 million bbl (2.46 million m^{3}), as estimated by McDaniel. In addition, SPDC carried an exploration portfolio of 15 prospects and leads within OML 40 with total unrisked mean crude oil Prospective Resources of 356 million bbl (56.6 million m^{3}), which have not been audited by McDaniel.

From 1975 until 2006, the Opuama field in OML 40 produced approximately 43 million bbl (6.8 million m^{3}). In 2006, SPDC undertook a controlled shutdown of certain of SPDC’s assets in the Niger Delta, including OML 40, as they were unable to continue to operate these assets due to security problems. Eland considers the security issues that prevented SPDC from producing from the OML 40 Lease area in March 2006 to be regional, not specific to the licence area, and substantially mitigated by the federal Government Amnesty programme in 2009, which offered unemployed youths from the Niger Delta the opportunity to train for employment in the oil and gas industry by way of Government sponsored schemes.

Eland intends to re-commission existing infrastructure and restart existing wells to re-commence production at an initial gross rate of 2,500 barrels (400 m^{3}) of oil per day with a target to grow gross production to 50,000 barrels (7,900 m^{3}) of oil per day within four years.

Nigerian crude is a high quality, light oil grade referred to as “Sweet”, which trades at a premium to Brent because of its high gasoline content and relatively low processing costs.
