= Independent Lawyers' Association of Myanmar =

Voluntary bar association

- မြန်မာနိုင်ငံလွတ်လပ်သောရှေ့နေများအသင်း
- Abbreviation: ILAM
- Formation: January 19, 2016; 10 years ago
- Type: Bar association
- Headquarters: Myanmar
- Members: 5,000 (2016)

The Independent Lawyers' Association of Myanmar (ILAM; Burmese: မြန်မာနိုင်ငံလွတ်လပ်သောရှေ့နေများအသင်း), founded 19 January 2016, is a voluntary bar association of lawyers in Myanmar (Burma), and is the first national, independent professional organisation of lawyers in Myanmar. ILAM was formed in collaboration with the International Bar Association's Human Rights Institute (IBAHRI).

== See also ==
- Bar association
