= Listed buildings in Burton, Staffordshire (civil parish) =

Burton is a civil parish in the district of East Staffordshire, Staffordshire, England. It contains 103 listed buildings that are recorded in the National Heritage List for England. Of these, one is listed at Grade I, the highest of the three grades, five are at Grade II*, the middle grade, and the others are at Grade II, the lowest grade. The parish contains the centre and the east part of the town of Burton upon Trent. The listed buildings in the west of the town are included in Listed buildings in Horninglow and Eton. Most of the listed buildings are houses and associated structures, shops and offices. The town is a centre of the brewing industry and buildings associated with the industry are listed, some of which have been converted for other uses, including a museum. Other listed buildings include churches and associated structures, former schools, public houses and hotels, a water tower, courthouses, a market hall, a shelter on a walkway, a bridge, a former head post office, a rifle range, a war memorial, and a former cinema.

== Key ==
Grade	Criteria
I	Buildings of exceptional interest, sometimes considered to be internationally important
II*	Particularly important buildings of more than special interest
II	Buildings of national importance and special interest

== Buildings ==
Name and location	Photograph	Date	Notes	Grade
186 Horninglow Street; 52.80712°N 1.62690°W		14th century (probable)	A shop with living accommodation, it was remodelled and extended in the 18th century. It has a timber framed core, it was mainly rebuilt in brick and rendered, there are quoins and a band, the rear wing extension is in brick, and the roof is tiled. The front range has three storeys and three bays. In the ground floor are shop fronts and a round-headed passageway to the right, and the windows in the upper floors are casements. The rear wing has two storeys, and contains a canted bay window.	II
186A and 187 Horninglow Street; 52.80714°N 1.62672°W	—	14th century (probable)	A shop with living accommodation above, it was later remodelled and it was extended in the 19th century. It is in red brick with a timber framed core, and a tile roof. There are three storeys, and an L-shaped plan with a front of three bays and a rear wing on the left. In the ground floor is a shop front on the left and a carriageway on the right, and the windows are sashes.	II
51 and 52 High Street; 52.80399°N 1.62887°W	cntre	Late 14th century	The house, later a shop, it was later extended, remodelled in the 19th century, and refurbished in 1996. The building is timber framed, faced and partly rebuilt in brick, and rendered, and the roof is tiled. There are two storeys, two bays, a rear wing, and an outshut in the angle. In the ground floor is a modern shop front, and the upper floor contains sash windows.	II
188 and 189 Horninglow Street; 52.80710°N 1.62661°W	—	16th century (probable)	The building was remodelled in the 18th century and extended in the 19th century. It has a timber framed core, it is faced in brick and painted at the front, and has exposed timber framing at the rear, and a tile roof. The front has three bays, the left bay with two storeys, the other bays with three storeys, and there is a rear wing at the left giving an L-shaped plan. In the ground floor are shop fronts, and above are a mix of sash and casement windows.	II
Assembly Rooms; 52.80186°N 1.62955°W	—	Late 16th century (possible)	Originally a grammar school, it was extended in 1834, and has since been used for other purposes. It was further restored and extended in 1959–61. The building is in red brick with stone dressings on a plinth, with dentilled eaves, and a tile roof with coped gables. There are two storeys and five bays. In the centre is a stone porch with a Tudor arch. The windows vary; some are mullioned, some are casements, and some have hood moulds.	II
St Modwen's Church; 52.80142°N 1.62925°W		1719–26	The church was designed by William and Richard Smith of Tettenhall, and completed by Francis Smith. It is built in stone, it is in Palladian style, and consists of a nave with an apse at the east end, and a west tower. The tower is in three stages, and has clock faces, a balustrade, and urns on the corners. The windows have semicircular heads, and inside the church are galleries with Tuscan columns.	I
81 and 81A High Street; 52.80583°N 1.62723°W	—	Early 18th century	A roughcast shop with moulded stuccoed eaves and a tile roof. There are two storeys and an attic, and two bays. In the ground floor is a shop front, the upper floor contains sash windows with keyblocks, and there are two hip roofed dormers.	II
Manor House; 52.80055°N 1.62987°W	—	Early 18th century	The house, which was extended in the 19th century, is in red brick with plain and modillion eaves and a tile roof. There are two storeys, an original range with two bays, and a later two-bay wing on the right, also with two bays. The house contains a doorway with a fanlight, a canted bay window, and sashes.	II
146 High Street; 52.80349°N 1.62882°W		1750	The remodelling of an earlier building, it is in red brick with moulded eaves and a hipped slate roof. There are three storeys and five bays, the central bay slightly projecting and with a pediment. In the centre is a stone porch with pilasters and side lights, a cornice, and an open balustrade. Above this is a Venetian window and in the top storey is a tripartite lunette window. The other windows are sashes with flat heads.	II
46 High Street; 52.80360°N 1.62925°W	—	Mid 18th century	The building, which probably has an earlier core, is in red brick with a tile roof, three storeys, and three bays. In the ground floor is a 19th-century shop front and a doorway with a plain surround to the right. The upper floors contain sash windows with flat heads.	II
47 High Street; 52.80369°N 1.62914°W		Mid 18th century	The building is stuccoed, the ground floor is rusticated, and the roof is tiled. There are three storeys and three bays. In the centre is a semicircular-headed doorway with a moulded surround and a radial fanlight. The windows are sashes, and those in the middle bay are blind.	II
97 and 98 High Street; 52.80662°N 1.62663°W	—	18th century	A pair of shops dating mainly from the 19th century, they are in brick with moulded eaves and a tile roof. There are three storeys and three bays. In the ground floor are modern shop fronts, and the upper floors contain sash windows, the middle window in the top floor being blind.	II
99 and 100 High Street; 52.80673°N 1.62656°W	—	18th century	A pair of red brick shops with modillion eaves and a tile roof. There are three storeys and three bays. In the ground floor is a square-headed passageway flanked by modern shop fronts. Most of the windows in the upper floors are sashes.	II
101 High Street; 52.80680°N 1.62648°W		18th century	A roughcast shop with a band, a moulded stuccoed eaves cornice, a parapet, and a tile roof with coped gable ends. There are three storeys and two bays. In the ground floor is a 19th-century shop front, and the upper floors contain sash windows.	II
136 High Street; 52.80436°N 1.62811°W		18th century	The house, which was remodelled in the 19th century, is in red brick with stone dressings on a plinth, and is in Tudor style. There are quoins on the angles, and a moulded string course. The building has two storeys and three gabled bays, the outer bays projecting. In the centre is a porch with a four-centred arched head, and an entablature with a raised panel. The windows are mullioned and transomed in moulded architraves, and the gables are coped, the outer gables with ball finials. To the left is a single-storey extension and a screen wall with an archway.	II
6A Horninglow Street and Malthouse; 52.80693°N 1.62771°W	—	18th century	The building is in brick, the front is rendered, there is a dentilled eaves cornice, and a tile roof. The front facing the street has two storeys and four bays, and it contains casement windows. To the rear is the single storey malthouse and kiln. The kiln has a hipped roof and louvred vents.	II
180 Horninglow Street; 52.80717°N 1.62788°W	—	18th century	A red brick house with stone dressings on a plinth, with a moulded eaves cornice and a parapet. There are three storeys and five bays. The doorway in the right bay is stuccoed, and has a blocked radial fanlight, and a pediment. The windows are sashes in moulded architraves, and each has a pulvinated frieze and a keyblock.	II
185 Horninglow Street; 52.80713°N 1.62704°W		18th century	A shop with living accommodation that was extended in the 19th century. It is in red brick, the front is plastered, and it has a tile roof. The front range has two bays, the left bay has three storeys, the right bay has two, and there is a later rear wing. In the ground floor is a modern shop front, and the windows are a mix of sashes and casements.	II
Peel House; 52.79916°N 1.63461°W	—	Mid 18th century	The house was refronted in the early 19th century. It is in red brick with bands, corbelled eaves, and a hipped slate roof. There are three storeys and three bays. The central doorway is stuccoed and has Roman Doric columns and a moulded pediment. The windows are sashes with flat heads and plain keyblocks.	II
Wetmore Hall Farmhouse; 52.82174°N 1.61980°W	—	Mid 18th century	The farmhouse was altered in the 20th century. It is in red brick on a plinth, with bands, dentilled eaves, and a tile roof. There are two storeys and an attic, two parallel ranges, and a front of three bays. The windows are casements.	II
7 Bridge Street; 52.80708°N 1.62551°W	—	Late 18th century	The building is in brick with a stuccoed ground floor, moulded string courses, and a parapet. There are four storeys, the top storey added later, and four bays. The windows are sashes with flat heads and keyblocks.	II
2 Friars Walk; 52.80173°N 1.62951°W	—	Late 18th century	A red brick house with moulded eaves and a slate roof. There are three storeys and two bays. The doorway has a moulded surround, a fanlight, and an open pediment. In the centre is a three-light oriel window, and the other windows are sashes.	II
98, 99 and 100 Horninglow Street; 52.81084°N 1.63420°W	—	Late 18th century	A row of three red brick houses with dentilled eaves and a tile roof. There are three storeys and three bays. Each house has a doorway with pilasters, a rectangular fanlight, and a small cornice hood. The windows are sashes with channelled lintels.	II
61 and 62 High Street; 52.80464°N 1.62829°W		Late 18th century	A pair of red brick houses that have a tile roof with coped gable ends. There are three storeys and seven bays. The main doorways are paired, they are stuccoed, and have pilasters, radial fanlights, and open pediments, and there is a round-arched passageway in the first bay. The windows are sashes with flat heads and keystones.	II
65 High Street; 52.80499°N 1.62795°W	—	Late 18th century	The building is in red brick with moulded eaves and a tile roof. There are three storeys and three bays. The central doorway has a moulded surround, a rectangular fanlight, and a pediment. The windows are sashes in moulded frames.	II
102 High Street; 52.80687°N 1.62642°W		Late 18th century	A shop in red brick with a tile roof, three storeys, and three bays. In the ground floor is a shop front including two multi-paned bow windows and a door with a fanlight. The upper floors contain sash windows with flat heads.	II
50 Lichfield Street; 52.79928°N 1.63398°W	—	Late 18th century	A red brick house with bands, boarded soffit eaves, and a hipped slate roof. There are three storeys, three bays, and a later two-storey extension on the right. The central doorway has a moulded surround, a radial fanlight with Y-tracery, and an open pediment. The windows are sashes with flat heads and segmental reveals.	II
12 Market Place; 52.80163°N 1.62980°W	—	Late 18th century	A house, later offices, in brick, the ground floor stuccoed, and the upper part painted. It has modillion eaves, a tile roof, three storeys and two bays. In the ground floor is a doorway and a replaced window, and the upper floors contain sash windows.	II
1 and 2 New Street; 52.80101°N 1.63160°W	—	Late 18th century	A pair of stuccoed shops with modillion eaves and a tile roof. There are three storeys and three bays. In the ground floor are two modern shop fronts flanking a square-headed passageway. The upper floor contains casement windows in the middle bay and sash windows in the outer bays, all with segmental heads.	II
3 New Street; 52.80101°N 1.63174°W	—	Late 18th century	A shop in painted brick with modillion eaves and a tile roof. There are three storeys and three bays. In the ground floor is a modern shop front with a dentilled cornice, and to the right is a doorway. The upper floors contain sash windows; the window in the right bay in the middle floor is blind.	II
4 New Street; 52.80101°N 1.63182°W	—	Late 18th century	A painted brick shop with corbelled eaves and a tile roof. There are two storeys and two bays. In the ground floor is a modern shop front, and the upper floor contains modern casement windows with channelled lintels.	II
170–172 Station Street; 52.80396°N 1.63325°W	—	Late 18th century	A row of three red brick cottages with modillion eaves and a tile roof. There are two storeys and four bays. The doorways, which have plain surrounds, and the windows, which are sashes, have channelled lintels and keyblocks.	II
Anchor Inn Public House; 52.80104°N 1.63201°W	—	Late 18th century	The public house is in painted brick with a roof of tile and slate. There are three storeys and two bays, and a wing on the left with two storeys and one bay. In the ground floor is a 19th-century inn front with arched lights and a dentilled cornice. The upper floors contain sash windows with channelled lintels.	II
Nunneley House; 52.80684°N 1.62523°W		Late 18th century	A red brick house with corbelled eaves, and a slate roof with coped gable ends. There are three storeys and five bays, the middle bay projecting slightly under a pediment. The central doorway has a stuccoed surround with Roman Doric columns, a rectangular fanlight, and a pediment. Above it is a Venetian window, and in the top floor is a three-light semicircular window. The other windows are sashes with flat heads and keyblocks.	II
Queen's Hotel; 52.80708°N 1.62590°W		Late 18th century	The hotel is in brick, and has a moulded cornice and a parapet. There are three storeys and four bays, and a lower two-bay wing on the right. The windows are sashes with keyblocks and aprons, and the doorway has an arched head.	II
5 Horninglow Street; 52.80694°N 1.62717°W	—	c. 1792	A red brick building with bands, a dentilled eaves cornice and a blocking course. There are three storeys and five bays. The central doorway is stuccoed, with Tuscan columns and pilasters, a radial fanlight, a dentilled pediment, and side lights. The windows are sashes, the window above the doorway with dripstones.	II
7 Green Street; 52.79846°N 1.63184°W	—	c. 1800	A red brick house with moulded eaves and a tile roof. There are three storeys and two bays. The doorway to the left is recessed and has a radial fanlight, and the windows are sashes.	II
66 and 67 High Street; 52.80511°N 1.62790°W	—	c. 1800	A pair of houses in red brick with stone dressings, moulded stuccoed eaves, and a slate roof. There are three storeys and four bays, the outer bays projecting slightly. In the outer bays are doorways with rusticated surrounds and Ionic pilasters, between them are two three-light windows, and above all is a moulded entablature. The upper floors contain sash windows with panelled lintels and keyblocks.	II
6 Horninglow Street; 52.80695°N 1.62786°W	—	c. 1800	A red brick house with bands, corbelled eaves and a slate roof. There are three storeys and three bays. The central doorway has a moulded surround, a blocked radial fanlight, an open pediment, and side lights. The windows are sashes, those in the ground floor with three lights and segmental heads.	II
181 Horninglow Street; 52.80715°N 1.62760°W	—	c. 1800	A red brick house on a plinth, with bands, dentilled eaves cornice and a blocking course. There are three storeys and three bays. In the middle bay is a stuccoed doorway with Composite columns, a radial fanlight, and a dentilled pediment, and above is a sash window with stuccoed shafts, and a moulded cornice, both in an arched recess. The doorway is flanked by three-light sash windows, each in an arched recess, and the other windows are also sashes. To the left is a full-height arched recess containing a doorway with a radial fanlight.	II*
9 Lichfield Street; 52.80038°N 1.63175°W	—	c. 1800	A red brick house with a band, moulded eaves, and a tile roof. There are three storeys and three bays. Steps lead up to the central doorway that is stuccoed and has pilasters, a radial fanlight, and a moulded pediment. It is flanked by three-light windows with a moulded fascia, and in the upper floors are sash windows, the window above the doorway with an architrave.	II
10 Lichfield Street; 52.80026°N 1.63181°W	—	c. 1800	A red brick house on a stone base and a cement plinth, with sill bands, moulded eaves, and a tile roof. There are three storeys and three bays. Steps lead up to the central stuccoed doorway that has a traceries fanlight and a pediment on consoles. It is flanked by three-light windows with stuccoed pilasters and a moulded cornice in an arched recess. The windows are sashes, the window above the doorway with stuccoed engaged shafts and a festooned cornice.	II
Buildings in Marston's Yard; 52.80754°N 1.62694°W	—	Late 18th or early 19th century	Formerly a brewery, the buildings are in red brick with slate roofs, and form ranges on three sides of a cobbled yard. The buildings are in one or two storeys, and contain casement windows, and there are external steps and a ridge ventilator.	II
Three posts east of 102 High Street; 52.80693°N 1.62627°W	—	Early 19th century	The three posts near the edge of the pavement are in oak, they are roughly octagonal and tapering. Two of the posts have wrought iron caps.	II
4 Horninglow Street; 52.80694°N 1.62701°W	—	Early 19th century	The building is in red brick with moulded eaves and a slate roof. There are three storeys and three bays. In the ground floor is a modern multi-paned shop front, and the upper floors contain sash windows.	II
107–113 Horninglow Street; 52.81030°N 1.63390°W	—	Early 19th century	A group of eight cottages arranged in three blocks. The cottages are stuccoed with slate roofs, and have two storeys. The central block has four cottages, the outer blocks have two each, and they are joined by single-bay links containing a door with a hood mould. The outer blocks have three bays, sill bands, paired central doorways in a gabled porch, and casement windows, those in the right block with hood moulds. The central block has three gables, two pairs of doors in gabled porches with fretted bargeboards, and modern windows with hood moulds.	II
127 Horninglow Street; 52.80930°N 1.63326°W	—	Early 19th century	A red brick house with a tile roof, it has two storeys and two bays, the right bay protruding and gabled. In the right bay is a canted bay window, and in the angle is a lean-to porch with a pointed arch and a doorway with a rectangular fanlight. Most of the windows have Gothick glazing and hood moulds.	II
167 Horninglow Street; 52.80731°N 1.62960°W		Early 19th century	A red brick house on a plinth, with bands, a dentilled eaves cornice, a blocking course, and a slate roof. There are three storeys and five bays, the middle bay projecting slightly under a pediment. The central doorway has a stuccoed surround, a radial fanlight, a cornice hood with festoons, and a pediment on consoles. The windows are sashes, those in the middle bay in moulded architraves, and the window above the doorway with a dentilled cornice hood on consoles.	II
168 and 169 Horninglow Street including rear range 52.80733°N 1.62930°W		Early 19th century	A former maltings with later additions. It is built in red brick with some stone dressings. Facing the street is a block with a tile roof, two storeys and three bays, the outer bays slightly projecting, and each containing a recessed cambered arch. It is on a plinth, it has a band, and at the top are a frieze and two pediments. The central doorway has a round-headed doorway with a fanlight, and the windows are sashes, round-headed in the ground floor and with flat heads above. To the left is a lower two-storey wing with a pediment, containing a carriageway and windows. At the rear of the right block are three storeys and four bays. Beyond this is a taller block with three storeys and a basement, eight bays, and a corrugated asbestos roof with ridge ventilators, and further beyond is a lower three-storey block.	II
178 and 179 Horninglow Street; 52.80717°N 1.62807°W	—	Early 19th century	The building is stuccoed, on a plinth, with a band, moulded eaves, and a blocking course. There are three storeys and six bays. In the ground floor, the third bay contains a semicircular archway, in the right bay is a doorway with a moulded surround, a radial fanlight, and a cornice hood on consoles, and the windows are sashes.	II
182 Horninglow Street; 52.80715°N 1.62744°W	—	Early 19th century	A stuccoed house with corbelled eaves and a slate roof, it has two storeys and three bays. In the ground floor is a doorway with a plain surround to the right and two tripartite sash windows, and the upper floor contains casement windows.	II
183 and 184 Horninglow Street; 52.80713°N 1.62731°W	—	Early 19th century	A red brick house with moulded eaves and a tile roof. There are three storeys and three bays. The central doorway has a plain surround and a rectangular fanlight, and the windows are sashes with flat heads.	II
190 and 191 Horninglow Street; 52.80711°N 1.62641°W	—	Early 19th century	The building is in red brick with moulded eaves, and a tile roof with coped gable ends. There are three storeys and five bays. In the ground floor is a doorway with a semicircular head, a radial traceried fanlight and a recessed door, to the left is a bow window, and to the right is a 19th-century shop front. The upper floors contain sash windows with channelled lintels.	II
192 Horninglow Street; 52.80712°N 1.62627°W	—	Early 19th century	At one time a hotel, the building is in red brick with a moulded cornice and a parapet. There are three storeys, and a front of one bay. In the ground floor is a multi-paned window with a moulded fascia, and to the left is a doorway with a moulded surround. The windows are two-light sashes, the window in the middle floor in an arched recess.	II
1 Lichfield Street; 52.80095°N 1.63146°W	—	Early 19th century	A stuccoed shop with corbelled eaves and a hipped slate roof. There are three storeys and three bays. In the ground floor is a modern shop front, and the upper floors contain sash windows.	II
13 Market Place and 1 Friar's Walk; 52.80166°N 1.62962°W	—	Early 19th century	A red brick house with a sill band, moulded stucco eaves, and a slate roof. There are three storeys, three bays on Market Place and two on Friar's Walk. In the centre is a doorway with a plain surround and a rectangular fanlight, and to the left of it is a late 19th-century shop window. The other windows are sashes, and some are blocked.	II
7 and 8 New Street; 52.80105°N 1.63214°W	—	Early 19th century	A pair of red brick shops with modillion eaves and a tile roof. There are two storeys and two bays. In the ground floor are shop fronts with arched lights flanked by doorways with rectangular fanlights, all under a dentilled cornice. The upper floor contains sash windows with plain lintels.	II
9 and 10 New Street; 52.80106°N 1.63225°W	—	Early 19th century	A pair of brick shops, No. 9 is painted, with modillion eaves and a slate roof. There are two storeys and three bays. In the ground floor are paired doorways in the centre with rectangular fanlights flanked by 19th-century shop fronts with arched lights, all under a dentilled cornice. In the upper floor, No. 9 has a sash window, and No. 10 has two casement windows with pain lintels.	II
152–155 Station Street; 52.80462°N 1.63507°W	—	Early 19th century	A group of shops and a house on a corner site. They are in brick, the upper storeys of the shops are roughcast and the roof is slated. There are two storeys, five bays on Station Street, four on George Street, and a canted bay on the corner containing a shop doorway with reeded pilasters. On Station Street are shop fronts in the ground floor and a round-arched passageway in the centre. In George Street is a doorway with pilasters. The windows are sashes.	II
Devonshire Arms Public House; 52.80536°N 1.63804°W		Early 19th century	The ground floor of the public house is in engraved stucco, the upper floor is roughcast, it has pseudo-quoins, a sill band, and a coped parapet. There are two storeys, and three bays on the front and on the left return. On the front is a doorway with pilasters, a rectangular fanlight, and a cornice hood, and the windows are sashes with plain lintels. In the left return are three windows with hood moulds, and multi-paned cast iron lights. The outer windows have pointed heads, and Y-tracery, and the smaller central window has a flat head and lozenge-pattern glazing.	II
Grail Court Hotel; 52.80419°N 1.63397°W		Early 19th century	Formerly the Midland Hotel, it has been extended, it is stuccoed, and has slate roofs. The original block has three storeys, two bays on Station Street, three bays on Guild Street and a two-storey extension. On the corner is a canted bay containing a doorway with a pediment on consoles. To the right is a later wing with two storeys and an attic, the lower storey projecting, and containing a doorway. Most of the windows are sashes, and on the later wing are five hip roofed dormers.	II
Trent House; 52.80710°N 1.62532°W	—	Early 19th century	A red brick house with stone dressings, the ground floor is stuccoed, above it is a moulded cornice, and at the top is a cornice and a parapet. There are three storeys and five bays. In the centre is a porch with Ionic columns, and a doorway with a rectangular fanlight. The windows are sashes in architraves, the window above the doorway also with a pediment.	II
150, 150A and 151 Station Street; 52.80474°N 1.63542°W	—	Early to mid 19th century	Red brick houses with a frieze, a stuccoed moulded eaves cornice, and a hipped slate roof. There are two storeys and six bays. The main doorways have stuccoed pilasters, a triglyph frieze, and a pediment, and each doorway is flanked by canted bay windows with swept roofs. To the right is a smaller round-arched doorway with a radial fanlight. In the upper floor are sash windows in shaped architraves, those above the doorways with square heads, and the others with segmental heads and keyblocks.	II
126 and 126A Station Street; 52.80563°N 1.63782°W	—	c. 1840	A red brick house with a dentilled band and a hipped slate roof. There are two storeys and three bays. To the right is a canted bay window, and the other windows are sashes with flat heads.	II
127 and 128 Station Street; 52.80556°N 1.63758°W	—	c. 1840	A pair of red brick houses with two dentilled bands and a hipped slate roof. There are three storeys and four bays. The windows are sashes with flat heads, and the doorways are on the sides.	II
129 Station Street; 52.80547°N 1.63739°W	—	c. 1840	A red brick house on a stone plinth, with side pilasters, moulded eaves, and a hipped slate roof. There are two storeys and three bays, The central doorway has pilasters, to its left is a square bay window, and the other windows are sashes with plain lintels and keyblocks.	II
130 and 131 Station Street; 52.80538°N 1.63719°W	—	c. 1840	A pair of red brick houses with corbelled eaves and a slate roof. There are two storeys and four bays. On the front is a stuccoed doorcase with Ionic pilasters with an entablature and a cornice. The windows are sashes with plain lintels and keyblocks. No. 131 has a canted bay window on the front. The right return has four bays and contains a doorway with pilasters and a cornice hood.	II
175 Station Street; 52.80387°N 1.63296°W	—	c. 1840	A red brick shop with a sill band, corbelled eaves and a slate roof. There are two storeys and two bays. In the ground floor is a 19th-century shop front with a panelled stall riser and a moulded cornice. The upper floor contains sash windows with engraved stucco lintels and cornices on leaf consoles.	II
High Street Evangelical Church; 52.80583°N 1.62753°W		1842	The church, which is in Gothic style, is in red brick, and has a gabled stone front facing the street. The front has three bays, the central bay recessed under an arch, and it contains doorways to the left and right. On the front are buttresses, in the outer bays are lancet windows, and on the gable apex is a finial.	II
Christ Church; 52.80209°N 1.63864°W		1843–44	A Commissioners' church in Gothic style, it is built in stone. The church consists of a nave, north and south transepts, a short chancel, and a west tower. The tower has three stages, buttresses, clock faces, and an embattled parapet with corner pinnacles. Along the sides of the nave are paired lancet windows.	II
Gates and gate piers southwest of 136 High Street; 52.80428°N 1.62832°W	—	19th century	In the centre are wrought iron gates flanked by octagonal stone piers with ogee moulded cornice caps and ball finials. On each side is a brick screen wall with stone coping containing a gateway.	II
Leopard Inn Public House; 52.79991°N 1.63187°W		Mid 19th century	The public house is in red brick with stone bands and an inscribed parapet. There are three storeys, and a front on Lichfield Street with two bays. In the ground floor is an inn front with three-light mullioned windows containing arched lights above a panelled stall riser. On the Abbey Street front is a doorway with a moulded surround and pilasters. The upper floors contain sash windows in stuccoed architraves.	II
Gates, railings and piers, St Modwen's Church; 52.80146°N 1.62974°W	—	19th century	The gates at the entrance to the churchyard are in wrought iron with an overthrow, and are flanked by wrought iron railings. At the ends are stone piers, each with a cornice cap and an urn finial.	II*
The Abbey; 52.80036°N 1.62911°W	—	19th century	A house, later used for other purposes, it incorporates 13th-century material, namely parts of the Infirmary of Burton Abbey. The building is partly in stone and partly in applied timber framing, it has a tile roof and two storeys. On the north front are two original arches.	II*
Malthouses Nos 16, 17, 18, 19 and 20 at former Bass Maltings; 52.81010°N 1.62738°W		1853–56	A group of malthouses in red brick on a blue brick plinth with roofs of slate partly replaced by tiles, and with coped gable ends. They have three or four storeys, and contain pivoted windows.	II
Brewhouse, Ind Coope Brewery; 52.80630°N 1.63820°W		c. 1856	The building was extended in 1890 and later. It is in red brick with slate roofs, and has an L-shaped plan. Facing the street are the gabled offices that have three storeys and an attic and four bays. Behind is the brewhouse, the left part has three storeys and a ground floor arcade of eleven arches, and the right part has a two-span roof, five storeys, and seven bays. There is a linking block on the right to the tower, which has five tall storeys, three bays on each side, and is surmounted by a water tank with a pyramidal roof and a ventilator.	II
Offices and brewhouse, former Allsopp's New Brewery; 52.80659°N 1.64006°W		1859–60	The offices face the street, with the brewhouse to the rear. The building is in red brick with dressings in stone and blue brick, parapets, and Welsh slate roofs. The offices have quoins, a dentilled string course, and moulded modillion eaves. There are two storeys, a front of six bays, and sides of ten bays. Steps lead up to the central doorway that has a moulded surround, a fanlight, and a flat hood on console brackets, and the windows have round heads and keyblocks. The brewhouse has three storeys and 29 bays.	II
5 Hawkins Lane; 52.81021°N 1.63302°W	—	1860	Originally the headmaster's house for Holy Trinity School, it was designed by G. E. Street. It is in red brick with a slate roof. There are two storeys and gables, and the windows are double sashes divided by colonettes.	II
Holy Trinity School; 52.81032°N 1.63264°W		1860	The school, designed by G. E. Street in Gothic style, is built in red brick with stone dressings, bands in blue brick, and a decorative slate roof. There is a single storey, a central range, and two projecting gabled wings. On the roof is a square bellcote set diagonally.	II
Constitutional Club; 52.80331°N 1.62918°W	—	Mid to late 19th century	The building is in red brick with stone dressings, the ground floor is faced in ashlar and is rusticated, and at the top is a plain frieze, a modillion eaves cornice, and a parapet. Above the ground floor is a frieze with roundels, and between the upper floors is a Greek key pattern. In the outer bays are doorways with rectangular fanlights, and cornice hoods on consoles. The windows are sashes with moulded architraves and cornices.	II
Bass New Brewery; 52.80466°N 1.63599°W	—	1864–65	The brewery is built in red brick with a four-storey block in the middle, and ranges of two and three storeys along the sides of a narrow rectangular yard. The walls have full-height arcades containing sash or pivoted windows. Facing the road the ranges have two gables with oculi, copings and kneelers. At the north end of the yard are cast iron water tanks on cast iron columns.	II
Former Offices, Allied Breweries; 52.80592°N 1.63876°W		1865	The offices, later the Guild Hall, are stuccoed, on a plinth, the ground floor is rusticated, the building has moulded corbelled projecting eaves, and a hipped slate roof. There are two storeys, six bays on Station Street and two on the east front. The upper storey of the first bay on Station Street is recessed. The windows are round-headed sashes, those in the ground floor with side lights and keystones. The doorway is in the east front and has a semicircular fanlight.	II
Bass museum of Brewing; 52.80813°N 1.63342°W		1866	Originally the joiners' shop of Bass Middle Brewery and later a museum, it is in red brick with corbelled eaves and a tile roof. There are three storeys and twelve bays, and the building contains arched recesses and segmental-headed windows. In the fourth bay from each end is a loading door.	II
Water Tower, Bass Brewery; 52.80338°N 1.62699°W		1866	The water tower is in red brick with a rectangular plan, and is 120 feet (37 m) high. There are five stages, stone string courses, each stage but the top stage contains a semicircular-headed window, and in the top stage are blind arches. At the top of the tower is a corbelled cornice, and a stepped parapet with a dated tablet. On the west side is a recessed doorway.	II
County Court; 52.80419°N 1.63361°W		c. 1870	The former County Court is in stone, and has rusticated pilasters at the sides, a cornice above the ground floor, a moulded sill band between the upper floors, a modillion eaves cornice, and a blocking course. There are three storeys, five bays, the central bay projecting and surmounted by an entablature containing the Royal Arms, and to the right is a lower single-bay wing. In the centre is a doorway with a rusticated surround, a semicircular fanlight, and a keyblock with a carved head, and there is a similar doorway in the right wing. The windows are sashes in moulded architraves, in the ground floor with round heads and keyblocks, and in the middle floor with cornices.	II
St Mary and St Modwen Church; 52.80509°N 1.63307°W	—	1878–79	A Roman Catholic church in Decorated style, to which the tower was added in 1897. It is built in red brick with some rendering, stone dressings and slate roofs. The church consists of a nave, north and south aisles, a sanctuary with north and south sacristies and a northwest tower. The tower has three stages, clasping buttresses, and a short stone spire. Above the west door are niches containing statues of St Mary and St Modwen.	II
53 High Street; 52.80409°N 1.62880°W		c. 1880	The building is in red brick on a stone plinth, with stone dressings, quoins, moulded string courses, a parapet with stone coping, two gables with obelisk finials on the front, and coped gables on the sides. There are two storeys and four bays. In the second bay is a doorway with a moulded surround and a rectangular fanlight, and the windows are mullioned and transomed with moulded architraves.	II
Offices, Bass Brewery; 52.80398°N 1.62845°W		c. 1880	The offices are in red brick with stone dressings on a plinth, and are in Tudor style. They have quoins and a moulded string course. The main block has two storeys, ten bays, and three gables. This is joined on the right by a single-storey two-bay link to a lower block with two storeys, four bays, and two gables. In the main block is a doorway with a moulded surround, a four-centred arched head, and a fanlight, and above it are the Royal arms, and in the lower block is a doorway with a plain surround and a fanlight. The windows are mullioned and transomed with moulded architraves, and most of the gables, which are coped, have obelisk finials.	II
Market Hall; 52.80112°N 1.62978°W		1883	The market hall, which was extended in 1925, is in brick with sandstone dressings and a slate roof. There are three storeys, and the main front has seven bays. The outer and middle bays project and have gables with semicircular pediments containing carvings. The entrance in the middle bay has pilasters and a pediment with an egg and dart cornice and contains a coat of arms. The carving in the gable above depicts King John and two knights. In the ground floor are shop fronts, and the upper floor contains mullioned and transomed windows.	II
Andresey Bridge; 52.80218°N 1.62712°W		1884	A footbridge crossing the River Trent, it is in iron and consists of a single span. The walkway is supported by latticed arched sides, and at the ends are stone piers with cornice caps carrying cast iron lamp standards.	II
Claymills Pumping Station; 52.82984°N 1.61138°W		1884–86	A former steam-powered sewage pumping station, later a visitor attraction, it was designed by James Mansergh to process brewery effluent. It is built in red brick with parapets and hipped slate roofs, and consists of two rectangular engine houses linked by a rectangular boiler house with a chimney stack. Each engine house has two storeys and a semi-basement on a plinth, with angle pilasters, bands and moulded cornices. The boiler house has one storey and a semi-basement, and pilasters dividing the bays. The chimney is octagonal and tapering, and is about 30 metres (98 ft) high.	II*
147 and 148 High Street; 52.80336°N 1.62904°W		c. 1890	A red brick building with moulded terracotta string courses, and coved overhanging eaves. There are three storeys and six bays. The doorway in the fifth bay is stuccoed and has three-quarter Tuscan columns, a plain entablature and a dentilled pediment. The windows are sashes with flat heads and moulded terracotta keyblocks.	II
Shelter, Stapenhill Viaduct; 52.79687°N 1.62864°W		1898	The shelter on the elevated walkway is in iron with sheeted sides and a gabled roof. At each end are columns with spike finials, an inscribed panel with scroll brackets surmounted by openwork cresting.	II
Plough Maltings; 52.80842°N 1.63109°W		1899–1902	The maltings, later used for other purposes, are in red brick with Welsh slate roofs. The main building has two storeys, ten bays, and a three-span roof. At right angles to the left are kilns, and to the right is the accumulator tower.	II
Ancillary buildings, Claymills Pumping Station; 52.82972°N 1.61099°W	—	1900	The oldest of the buildings are a workshop and an agitator engine house. The chief engineer's office and a tinsmith's shop were added in about 1910, followed by a dynamo house in 1936–37. The buildings are mainly in red brick with slate roofs, and form two separate blocks.	II
Former Head Post Office; 52.80173°N 1.63506°W		1905	The former post office has a ground floor in sandstone, and above it is in brick with stone dressings and bands. The south front has three storeys and attics, and three gabled bays, behind is a service tower, and a single-storey nine-bay wing. In the ground floor is a central doorway with a voussoired segmental arch and a pedimented hood, and in the outer bays are doorways surrounded by windows, and with curved hoods. In the middle floor are three-light windows, and the top floor are Venetian windows. In the gables are small two-light mullioned windows, and on the apices are finials, each with a cartouche.	II
56 High Street; 52.80434°N 1.62860°W		1906	The house is in red brick with stuccoed dressings, moulded sill bands, a corbelled eaves cornice, and a tile roof with coped gable ends. There are three storeys and five bays. The central doorway has fluted pilasters, a rectangular fanlight, and a voluted pediment on consoles. The windows are sashes; in the ground floor they have lintels decorated with garlands, and in the top floor they are voluted.	II
Magistrates' Court; 52.80780°N 1.63093°W		1909–10	The court is built in artificial stone, and is in English Baroque style. The projecting centrepiece contains a large semicircular-headed window with a festooned and voluted keyblock, and is flanked by engaged Ionic columns and cartouches. Above is an egg-and-dart frieze, a modillion eaves cornice, and a carved parapet. The whole building is surmounted by a drum and a cupola. On the sides are two-storey wings, the lower wing protruding and containing circular windows with Gibbs surrounds and doorways with moulded surrounds and cartouches above. The recessed upper storey has sash windows with keyblocks and a balustraded parapet.	II
Rifle Range Target Wall; 52.81931°N 1.61664°W	—	c. 1914	The rifle range target wall is built in brick with a cast iron facing to the central wall. It is symmetrical and consists of a central stop wall and flanking side walls. At the right end is the target store with two storeys and a slate roof.	II
War memorial 52.80044°N 1.63098°W		1922	The war memorial was designed by Henry Charles Fehr and consists of a bronze statue of a winged Victory holding a sword and a laurel wreath and standing on a bronze globe. This is on a square pedestal of Portland stone with cherubs on the corners. By the pedestal is bronze statue of Saint George, and one of Peace holding a dove. On the pedestal are bronze plaques with inscriptions relating to the two World Wars. The memorial is on a three-stepped base and is surrounded by a low wall.	II*
The Ritz Cinema; 52.80480°N 1.63420°W		1935	The cinema, now disused, is in brick on a steel frame, with stone dressings, and is in Modernist style. The entrance front is symmetrical, and has four storeys and five bays. Steps lead up to the entrance, over which is a canopy. In the first floor are five square windows, and in the second floor is a group of six smaller square windows, with further flanking windows. At the top is a stone cornice containing more windows. Inside there is a foyer with a café above, and beyond is a double-height auditorium.	II
