= Pillaton Hall =

Country house in Staffordshire, England, UK

Coordinates: 52.7141°N 2.0861°W

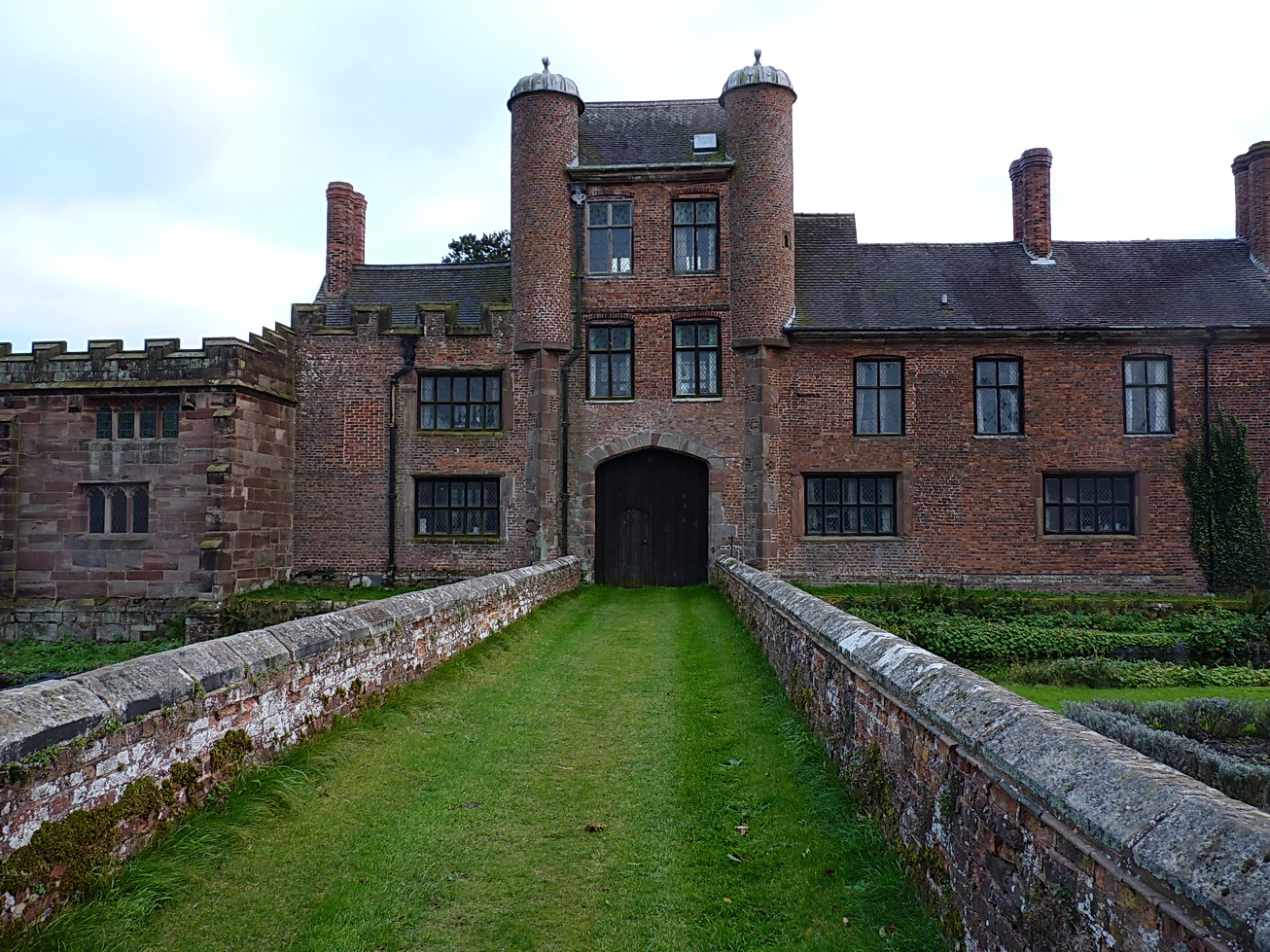
Pillaton Old Hall

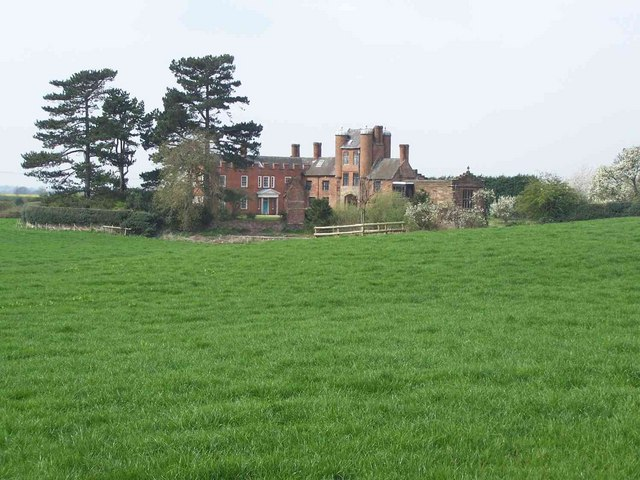
Remains of Pillaton Old Hall, near Penkridge, Staffordshire. The original moated manor house became ruinous, but the Gatehouse and Chapel were restored in the 1880s.

Pillaton Hall was an historic house located in Pillaton, Staffordshire, near Penkridge, England. For more than two centuries it was the seat of the Littleton family, a family of local landowners and politicians. The 15th century gatehouse is the main surviving structure of medieval Pillaton Hall. It is a Scheduled Ancient Monument and a Grade II* listed building. Attached to the Gatehouse to the east is the chapel formerly dedicated to Saint Modwen.

== Origins and history ==
By the mid-15th century, the manor of Pillaton belonged to the Wynnesbury family. There must have been a substantial building already on the site of the later Hall, presumably a fortified manor house, as the remains of the medieval moat are still very evident even from a satellite photograph. William Wynnesbury died in 1502, leaving the manor to his daughter Alice, who was married to Richard Littleton, formerly William's steward. When Alice died in 1529, Pillaton passed to their son, Edward Littleton. Later knighted, he died at Pillaton in 1558.

By this time the Littletons were set on a course for domination of the Penkridge area and it was around the mid-16th century that they built a substantial hall at Pillaton. The moated manor, built around a quadrilateral courtyard, comprising residential quarters and a Great Hall to the south, and a kitchen range to the west, was approached via the Gatehouse on the south. The Gatehouse, of two storeys rose to three in the centre, raised by four circular domed angle turrets. The chapel formerly dedicated to Saint Modwen lay next to the gatehouse on its eastern side.

In the 17th century the heads of the family became the Littleton Baronets and in the 19th the Barons Hatherton. However, the fourth and last of the Littleton baronets, who succeeded in 1742, moved the family seat north to Teddesley Hall, allegedly building it with hoards of cash discovered hidden at Pillaton.

Pillaton Hall was used for a time as a home for other members of the Littleton family. By 1786 it was inhabited by a farmer. Thereafter, the Hall fell into disuse and ultimately decay. Today the building is partly ruined and partly restored. The Littletons' family chapel, dedicated to St. Modwena, was restored by the Littleton family in the Victorian era and is used monthly for Anglican worship by the parish of Penkridge, using the Book of Common Prayer.

== The buildings today ==
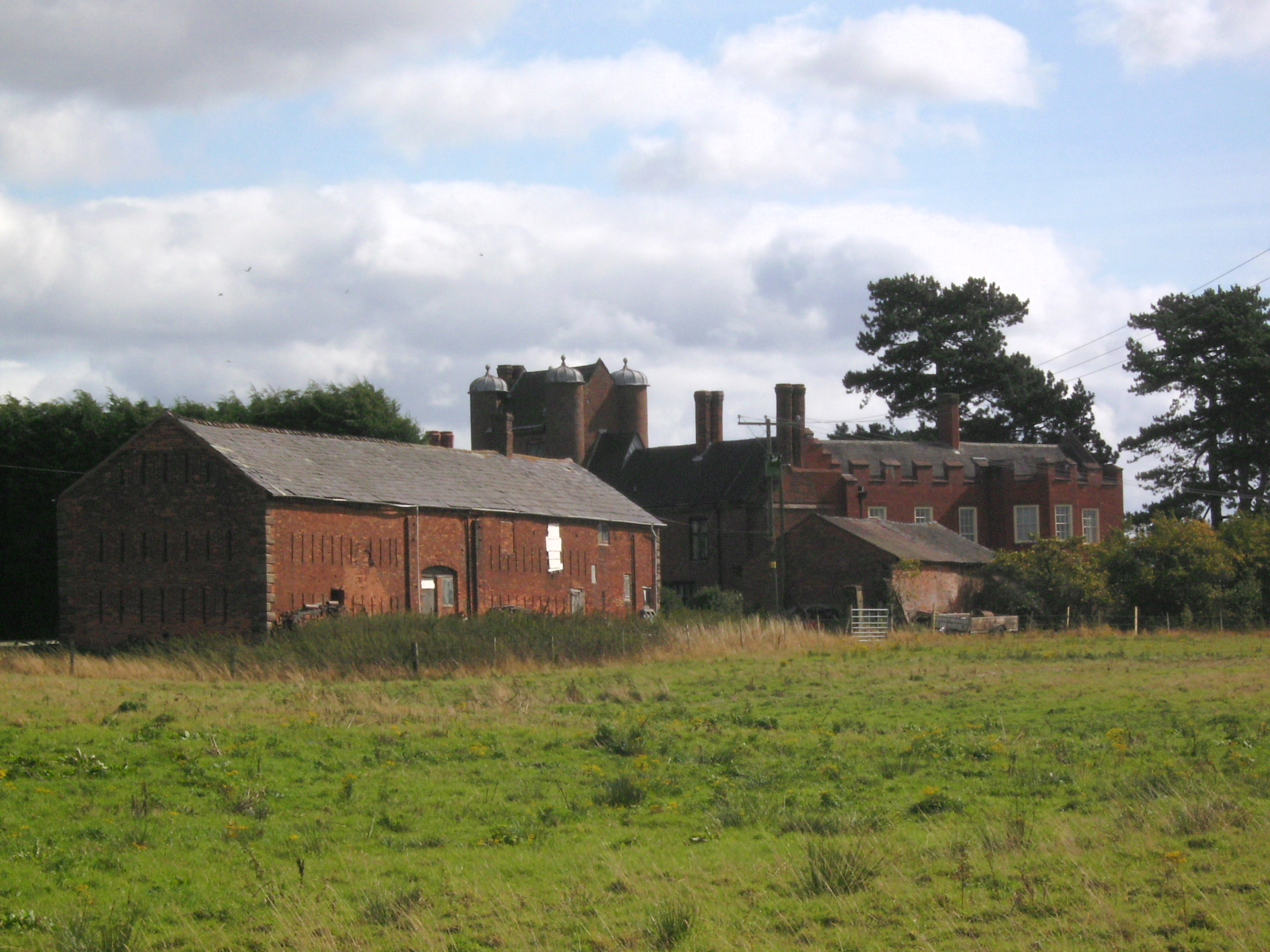
Pillaton Old Hall from the north-west: the Georgian barn is prominent to the left, with the modern building on the right, and the gatehouse range behind

The buildings are now marked on Ordnance Survey maps as "Pillaton Old Hall" and are located just to the south-west of Pillaton Hall Farm. The medieval moat, made up of round and rectangular elements is easily observed, both on the ground and on aerial photographs. The remaining old buildings are, however, all of the Tudor period, and were probably begun by the first Sir Edward Littleton, who died in 1558, although some of the work probably dates from later in the century. They are approached from the north by a bridge over the moat.

The main surviving structure is a gatehouse range, mainly two storeys high. However, the central block has three storeys and four angle turrets. The upper storey was rebuilt in 1706. The restored chapel of St Modwenna is at its eastern end. Originally the rest of the Hall stretched out to the south, forming a rectangle around a courtyard. The western range has now been partially replaced by a modern brick building. Further south is the base of a fireplace, probably that of the great hall. East of the remains of the Hall there is a rectangular brick garden wall, and to the north an 18th-century barn.

Pillaton Hall and its residents

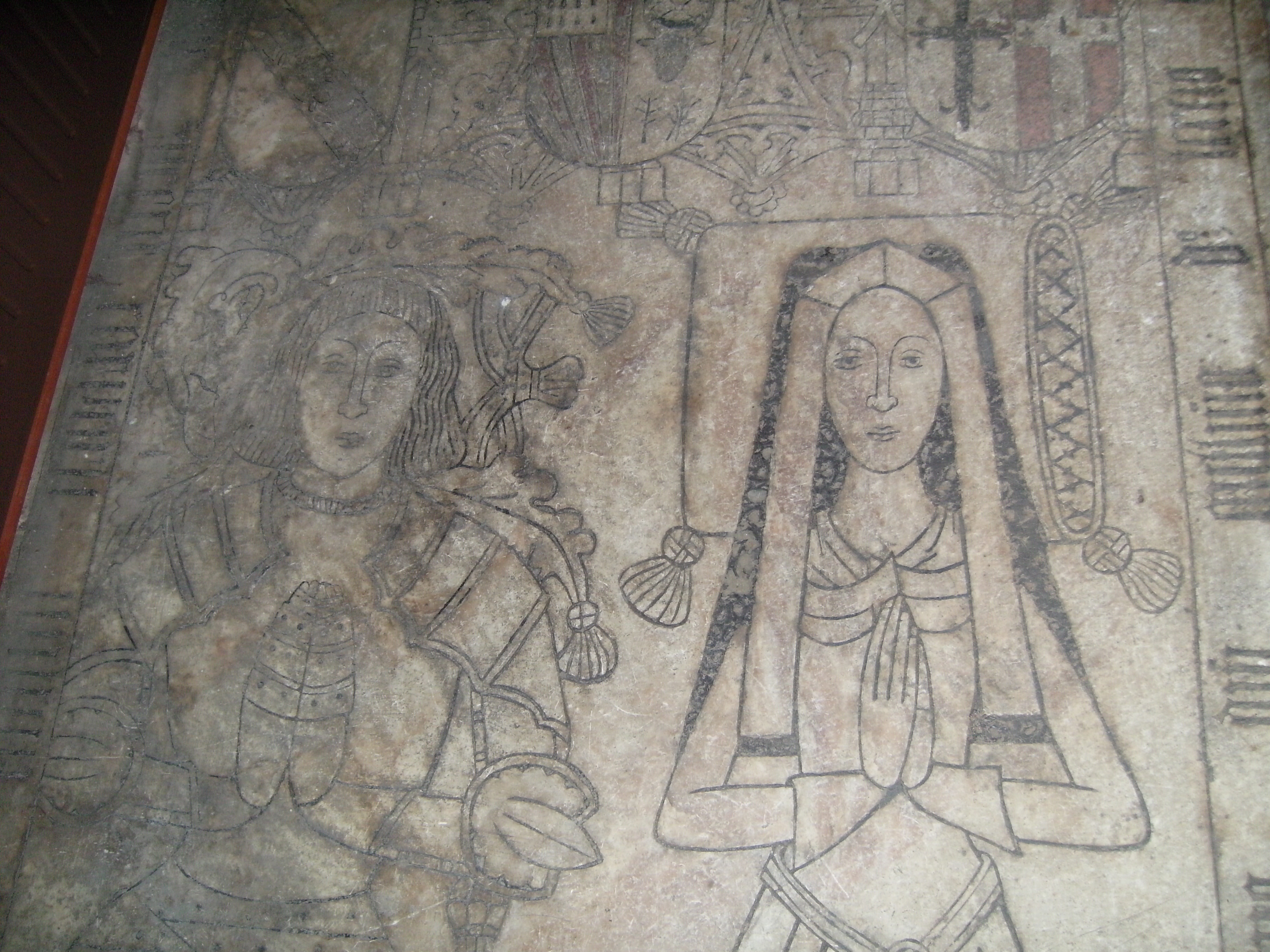
William Wynnesbury and his wife, from their memorial, now in the floor of the priest's vestry, part of the south chancel aisle, St. Michael and All Angels, Penkridge.

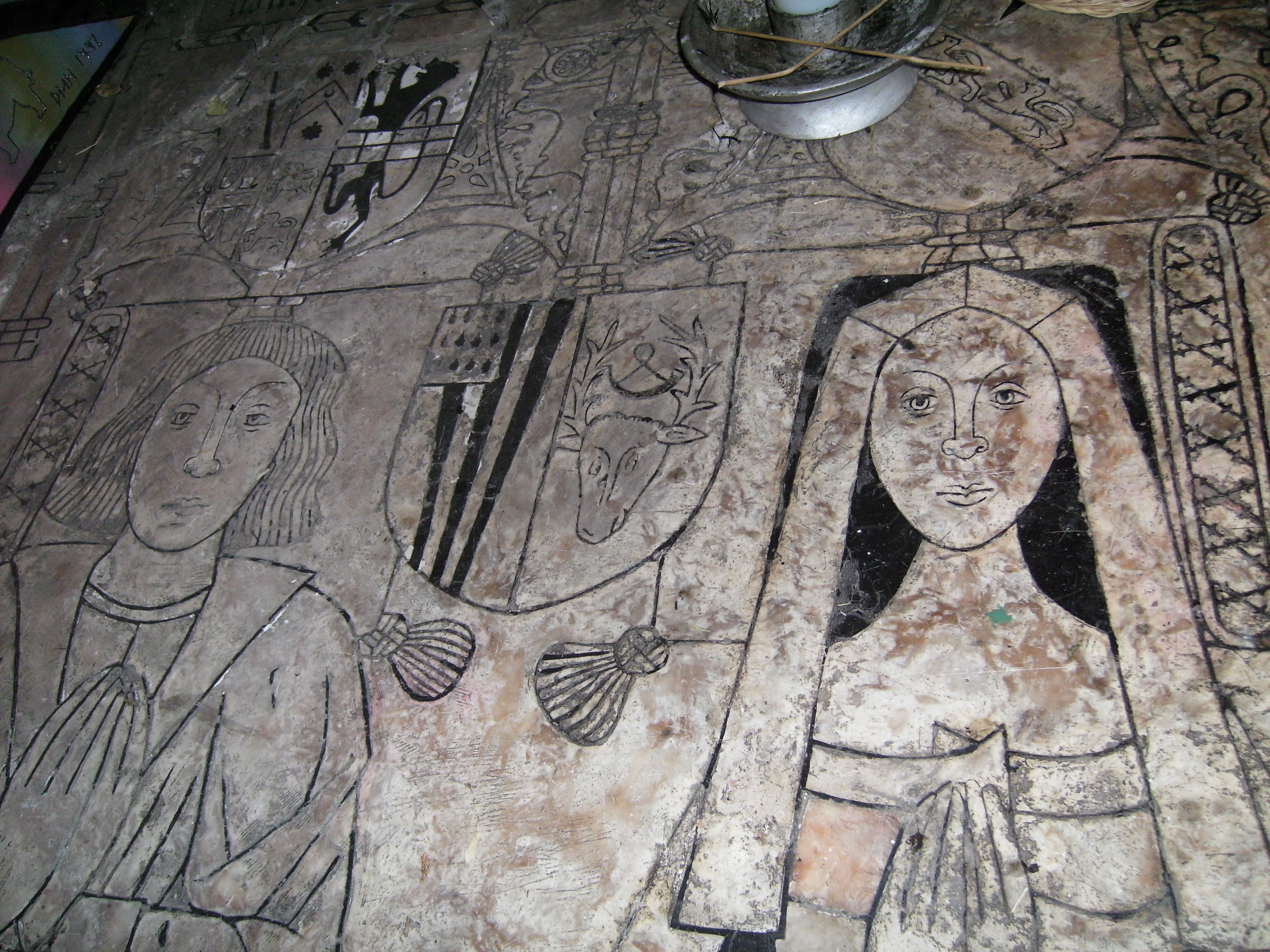
Image of Richard Littleton and Alice Wynnesbury, on incised slab of their recessed table tomb in the south nave aisle, very similar to the earlier Wynnesbury monument.

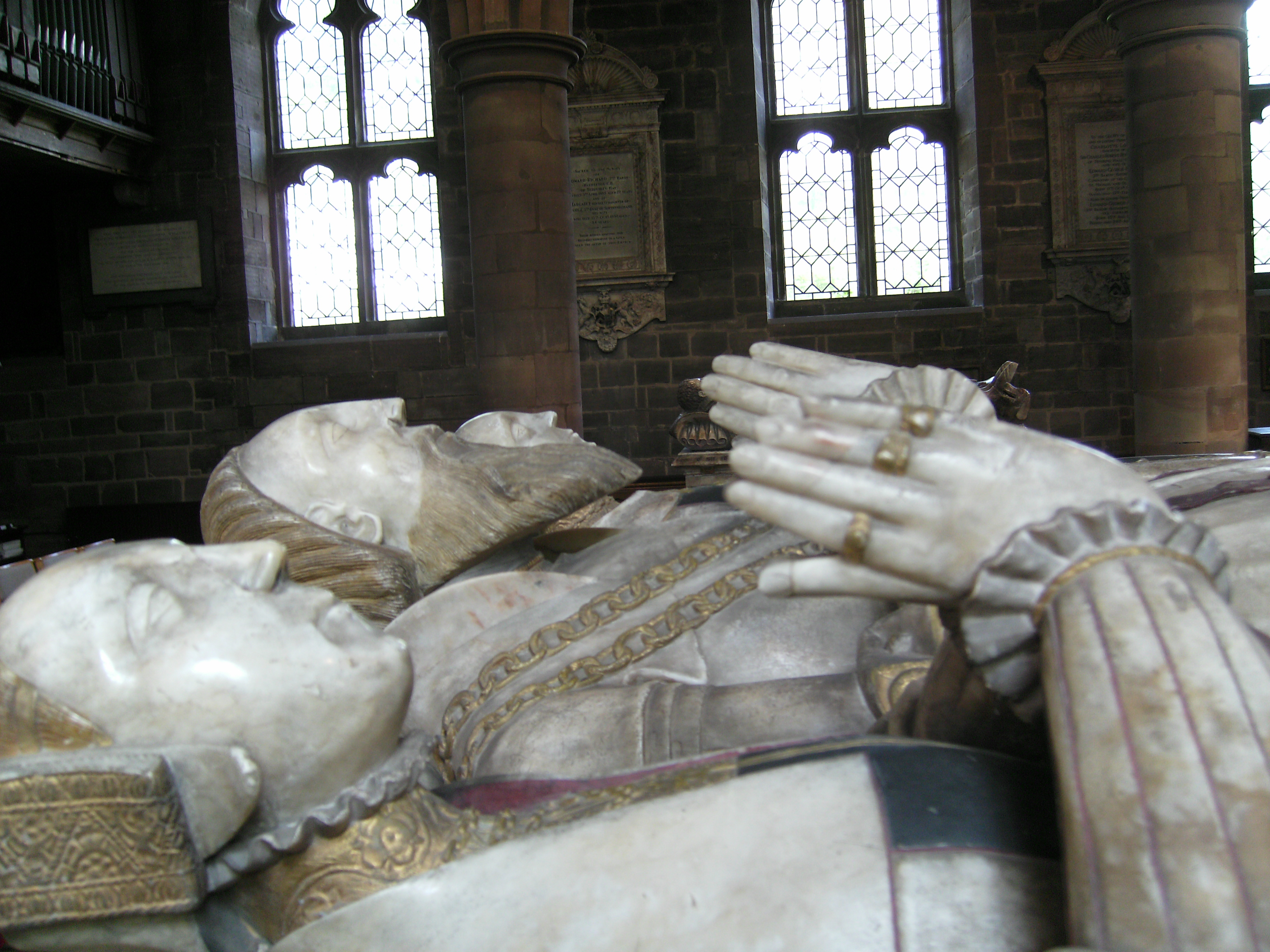
Tomb of Sir Edward Littleton (died 1558) and his wives, Helen Swynnerton and Isabel Wood. Attributed to the Royley workshop in Burton on Trent. Formerly close to the table tomb of Sir Edward's parents, this is now in the chancel.

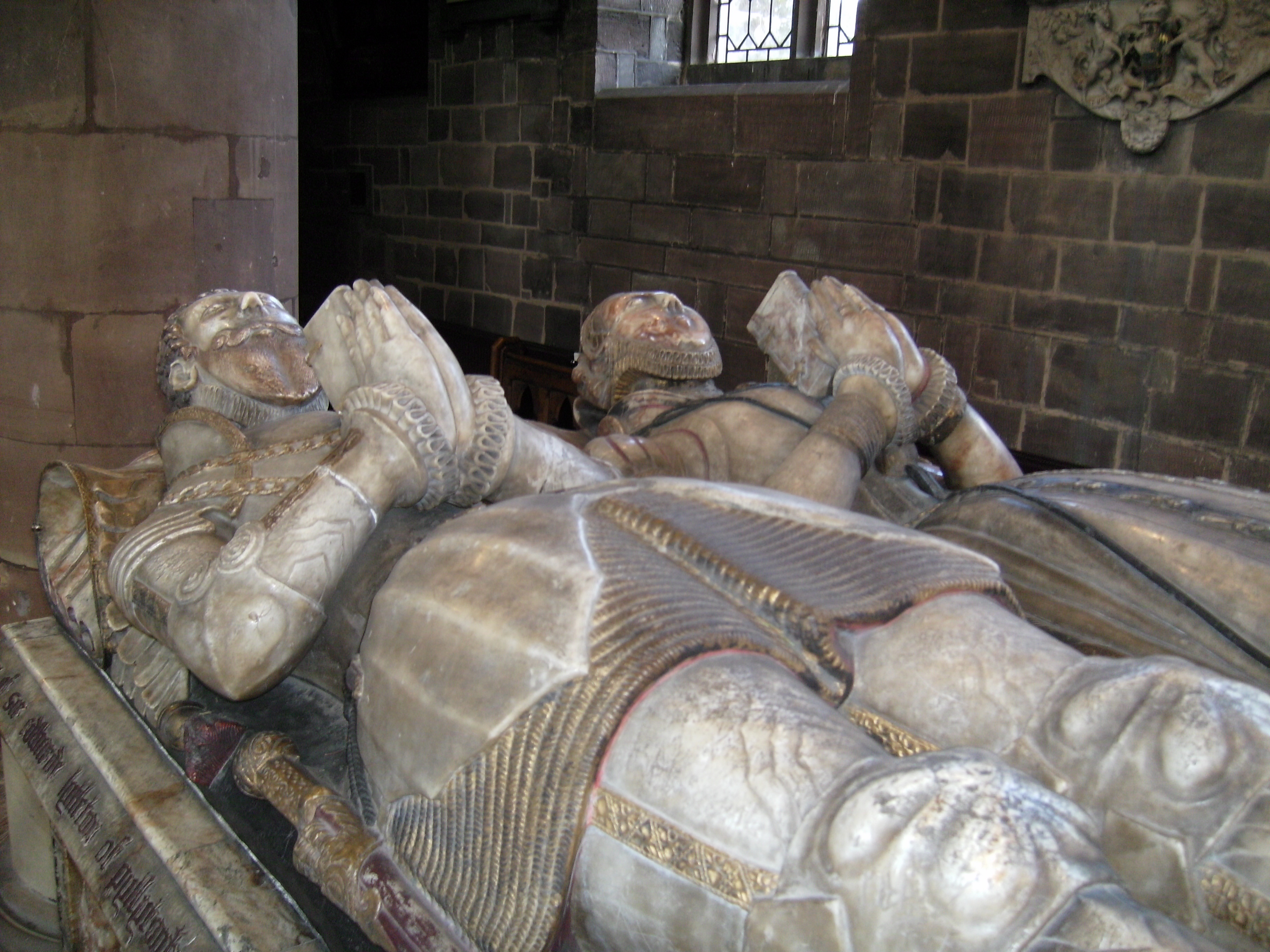
Tomb of Sir Edward Littleton (died 1574) and his wife, Alice Cockayne. The high ruffs for both are characteristic of the period. Attributed to the Royley workshop in Burton on Trent.

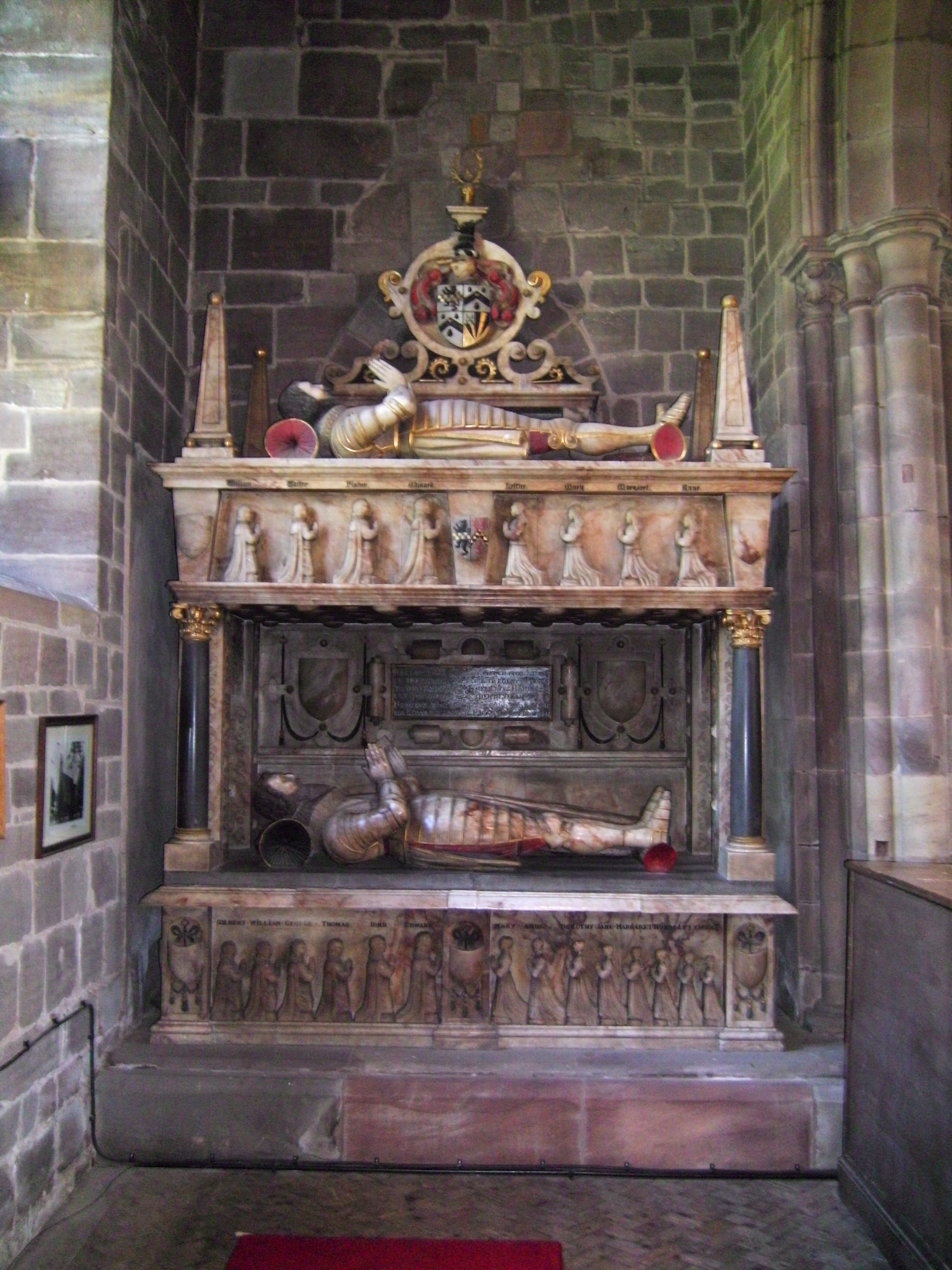
Tomb of two Sir Edward Littletons, father and son. East wall of north chancel aisle. Lower stage: Sir Edward Littleton (d. 1610) and his wife Margaret Devereux. Upper stage: Sir Edward (d. 1629), and his wife Mary Fisher. Their son, also Sir Edward, became the first baronet in 1627.

== See also ==
- History of Penkridge
- Grade II* listed buildings in South Staffordshire
- Listed buildings in Penkridge
- Littleton Baronets
