= Claymills Pumping Station =

Sewage pumping station in Burton upon Trent, England

Coordinates: 52.8298°N 1.6113°W

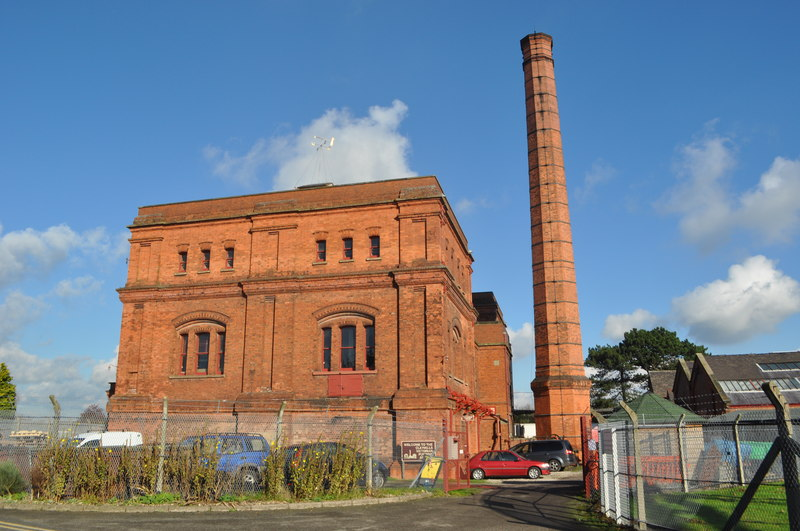
Claymills Pumping Station in 2010.

Claymills Pumping Station is a restored Victorian sewage pumping station on the north side of Burton upon Trent, Staffordshire, England DE13 0DA. It was designed by James Mansergh and used to pump sewage to the sewage farm at Egginton.

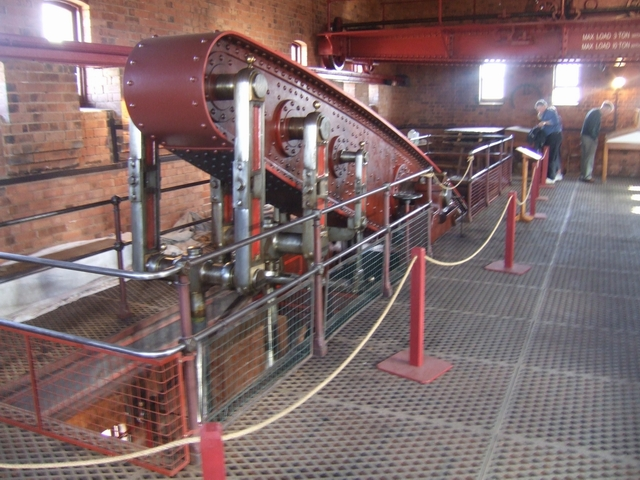
Beam of the 'D' engine

The main pumping plant consists of four Woolf compound rotative beam engines. These are arranged in mirror image pairs across two separate engine houses, with a central boiler house (containing five Lancashire boilers with economisers) and chimney. The engines were built in 1885 by Gimson and Company of Leicester. All the engines are similar, and the following description is limited to only one, but applicable to all.

The high-pressure cylinder is 24-inch bore by 6-foot stroke, and the low-pressure cylinder is 38-inch bore by 8-foot stroke. Steam is distributed by means of double beat 'Cornish' valves, mounted in upper and lower valve chests. The cylinders act on one end of the beam, via Watt's parallel motion. The beam itself is 26 feet 4 inches between end centres, 4 feet deep at the centre, weighs 13 tons and is carried on 12-inch-diameter (300 mm) bearings.

The four main pumping engines were all operational until 1969 when the A and B engines were halted, followed by the C and D engines two years later in 1971. The engines were gradually returned to operation three decades later, starting with C engine in 2000, D in 2002, B in 2017 and finally A in 2023. Since then, all four Woolf compound beam engines have been in steam for approximately 7 weekends per year.

The site boasts a total collection of 33 original running steam engines. The modern sewage works, run by Severn Trent Water, is situated alongside the pumping station.

== Restoration ==
The site was operational until 1971 when following this date the site fell into a state of severe disrepair. The Claymills pumping engines trust gained access to the site in 1993 and have been working to restore the site ever since. the site's good condition today is thanks to the commitment and skills of these volunteers.

Following the closure of the site in 1971 the site's former chief engineer went to great length to ensure the auxiliary steam plant was saved, dispersing a great number of the smaller steam engines on site to other museums and collections to ensure they were safe. thanks to these efforts the trust has been able to reacquire the vast majority of these engines.

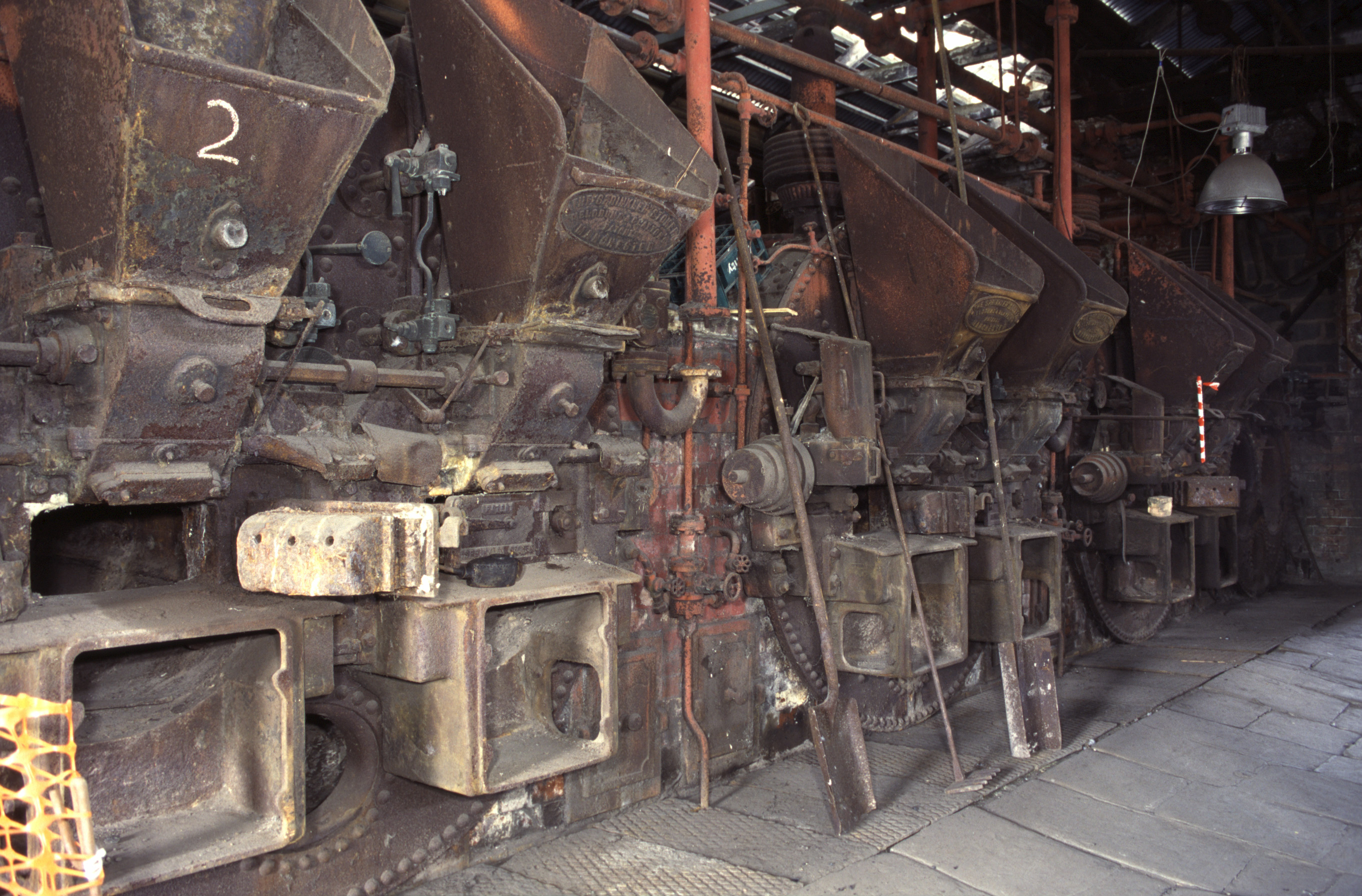
Claymills boilers, as found

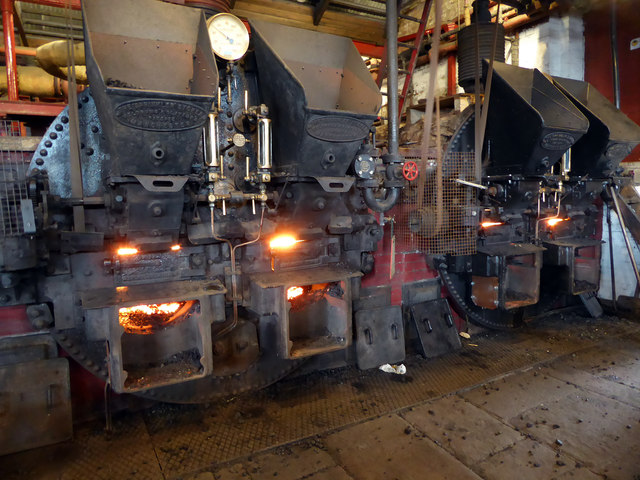
Claymills boilers, restored

== Dynamo House ==
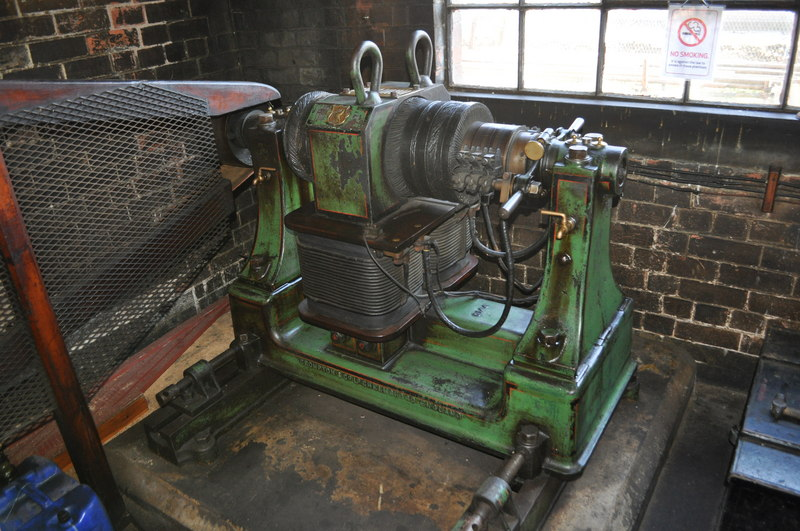
1889 open frame dynamo

The pumping station complex has a pair of steam driven dynamo engines, a Buxton & Thornley horizontal engine driving a 1889 Crompton open frame dynamo of 50 amps & a 1906 Claymills made engine driving a smaller closed frame 30 amp dynamo. Both dynamos are 200 volts DC and are both restored to running order. The main use of these dynamos was the supply of lighting to the site complex and accompanying workers cottages with the larger 50 amp dynamo running at night and the smaller 30 amp unit in the day. These provided all of the site electricity until 1971. The Claymills made engine driving the 30 amp dynamo is believed to have been manufactured on site in the workshop. It is a piston valve twin cylinder engine and the trust still have the wooden patterns for the cylinder block.

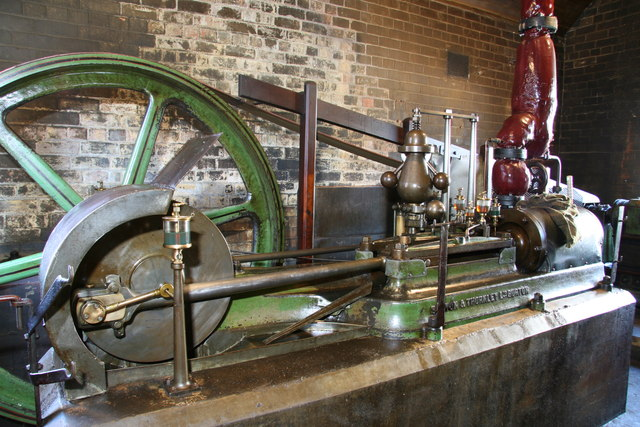
Buxton & Thornley steam engine driving 1889 open frame dynamo

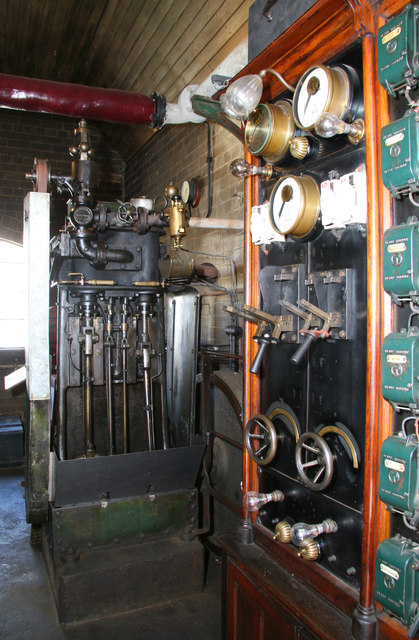
Twin cylinder engine driving 30 amp dynamo

The Large Buxton and Thornley horizontal steam engine driving the 1889 open frame dynamo has a version of Meyer shut off valve gear.

== Workshop ==
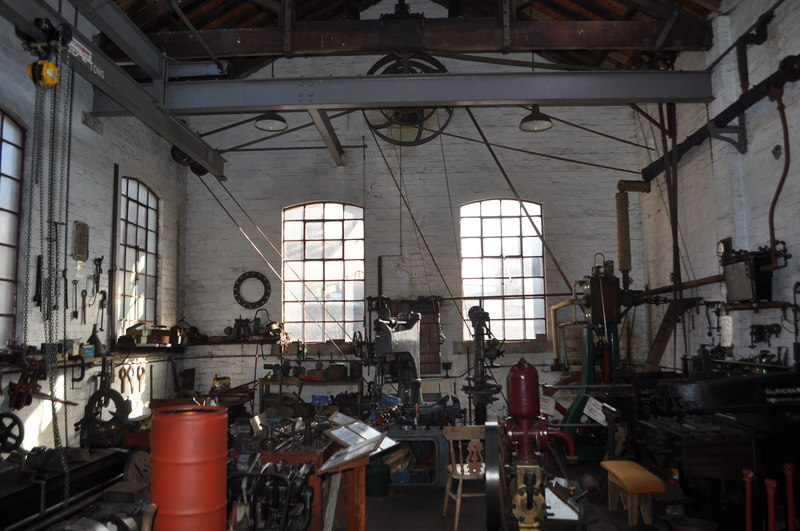
Claymills workshop

The site complex was significantly extended in 1900 when Burton corporation built a fairly sizable workshop on site. This remained the borough workshop until 1971. Following this all of the machinery was removed and disposed of. the vast majority has been re-acquired by the trust and the workshop has been restored to full running order.

== Boiler House ==
Steam for the pumping engines and auxiliary engines is raised in five Lancashire boilers, with the first set of boilers being made by Robert Stephenson and co. In normal operation only two out of the five boilers would be in steam with one on hot reserve and the other two having maintenance work. The boilers were on an 8 weekly rotation. These boilers were of wrought iron construction and were later renewed in 1936 with steel replacements by John Thomson and co. The changing of the boilers was done one at a time as the plant had to be kept operational during these upgrades. The fuel source of these boilers is coal. When the plant was first constructed the boilers were hand fired with the first steam driven mechanical stokers being installed in 1908. A second more reliable generation of mechanical stokers were phased in around 1920, with the boilers being upgraded to the new type of stokers as they dropped out of use. The engine and line shafting from the first set of stokers remained. These mechanical stokers are still in use to this day on the trusts steaming days (2023) The trust have been experimenting with firing on Biomass.

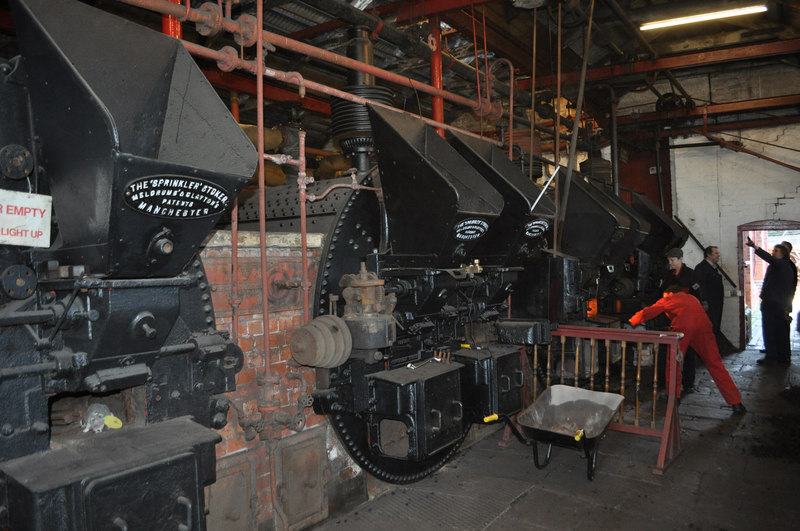
Claymills Lancashire Boilers

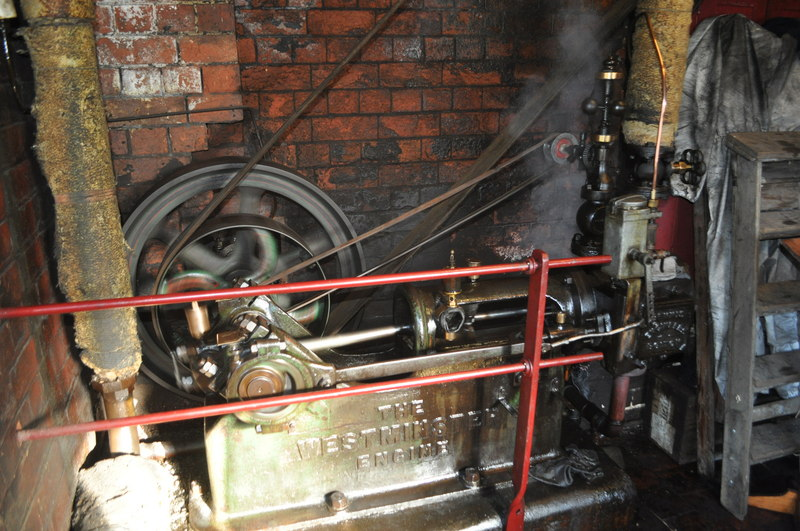
Bennis stoker engine

== See also ==
- Listed buildings in Burton (civil parish)
