= Burton, Staffordshire (civil parish) =

Civil parish in Staffordshire, England

Coordinates: 52.809558°N 1.6295385°W

Burton
- Location within Staffordshire
- Area: 5.48 km^{2} (2.12 sq mi)
- Population: 2,632 (2011 census)
  - Density: 480/km^{2} (1,200/sq mi)
- Civil parish: Burton
- District: East Staffordshire
- Shire county: Staffordshire
- Region: West Midlands
- Country: England
- Sovereign state: United Kingdom
- Website: https://www.eaststaffsbc.gov.uk/council-democracy/parish-councils/burton-parish-council

Burton is a civil parish in Staffordshire, England. It covers an area in the centre and north-east of Burton upon Trent. The population of the civil parish taken at the 2011 census was 2,632. The parish was created on 1 April 2003.

== See also ==
- Listed buildings in Burton, Staffordshire (civil parish)
