= John Young (architect) =

English architect and surveyor (1797–1877)

- John Young at the age of 70
- Born: 1797; Mildenhall, Suffolk, England
- Died: 23 March 1877 (aged 79–80); Stoke Newington, London, England
- Occupations: Architect, surveyor
- Known for: The Cancer Hospital, Brompton, London, 23–25 Eastcheap, London City of London surveyor

John Young (1797 – 23 March 1877) was an English architect and surveyor whose career spanned the grace of the Regency period and the pragmatism of the Industrial Revolution. While based primarily in the City of London, his practice, John Young & Son, Architects, was both eclectic and wide-ranging in South East England. He is particularly noted for his creative use of polychromatic brickwork whether in industrial, civic or residential contexts.

== Early career ==
Nothing is known about his early life in Suffolk, save that he was a Catholic, until Young came to London at the age of twenty two and became assistant to the ageing William Porden. He next assisted the prolific architectural prodigy and member of Nash's circle, Decimus Burton, by preparing in 1823 the drawings for the London Colosseum in Regent's Park and supervising the framing of the dome. A period followed in the employ of Thomas Cubitt creating the houses in Eaton Square and the Pimlico Estate. His own practice opened at 46 Clarges Street, Piccadilly. In 1828 he published a book of Shop Fronts, Porticoes and Entrances ... , which would have served as a catalogue of the time. On 1 January 1828 he married Caroline Pettis at St George's, Hanover Square. By 1830, the first of their nine children, John Edgar who would later join his practice, was born.

== City Surveyor ==
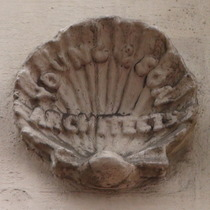
1862 signature in stone relief of Young & Son

He was Principal Assistant to William Montague, Clerk of the City's Works at the Guildhall and on his death, appointed by the Corporation of London locum tenens Clerk. He was subsequently District Surveyor of the Eastern Division of the City for twenty five years. If not destined for celebrity status in the architectural profession, his reputation as a highly skilled and safe pair of hands, meant the Lindsay family's solicitor insisted he supervise the three architects, including Lewis Vulliamy, building their luxury residence at 10 Grosvenor Square. He was, however, photographed by society photographer, Henry Maull. Alongside survey work, Young moved his practice, John Young & Son, Architects to 35 King Street, Cheapside. Immediately prior to 1843 when Young built his family home in Stoke Newington, the family are known to have lived in Thomas Cubitt's Albion Road in North London.

== Projects ==
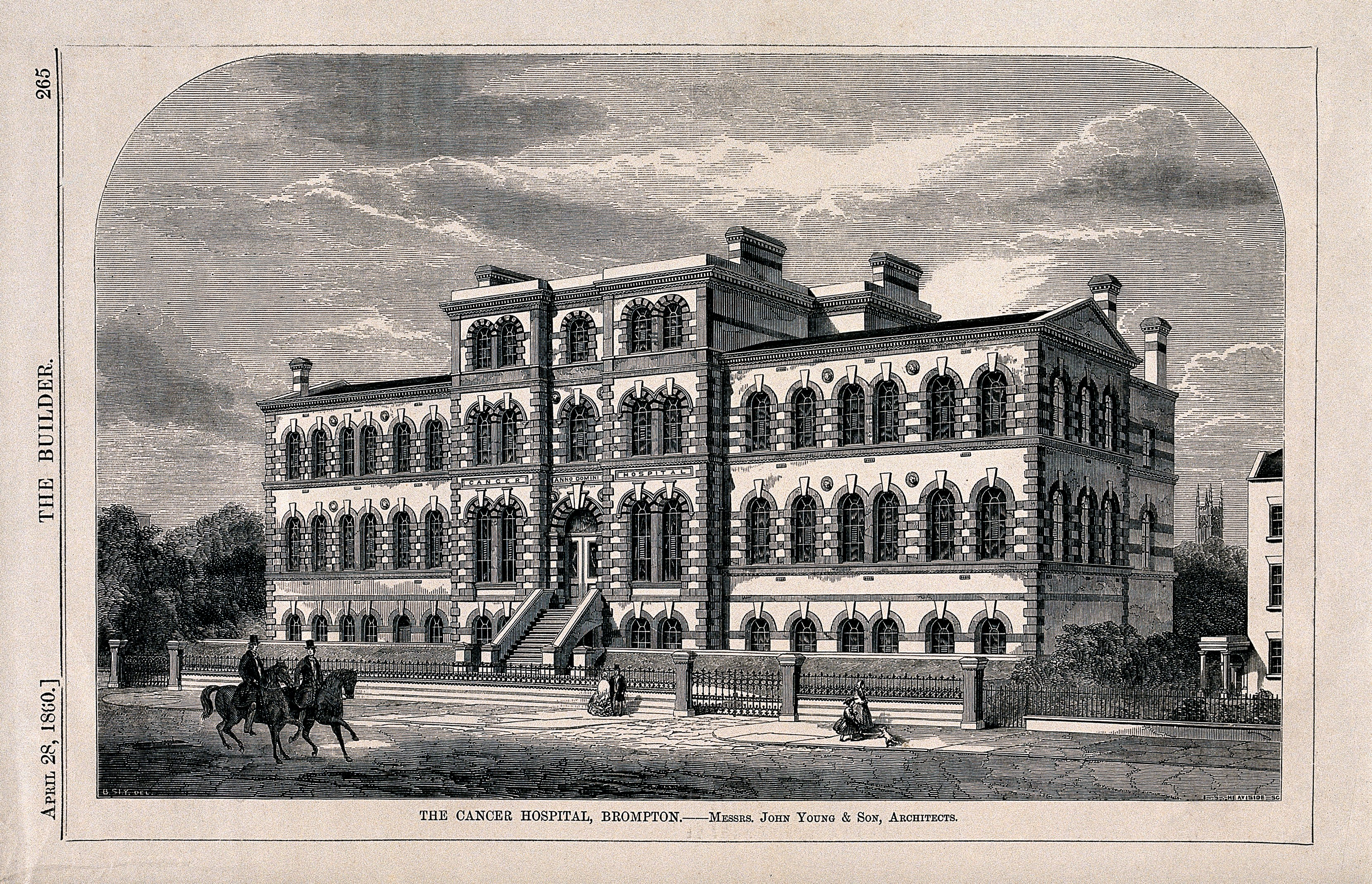
Brompton Cancer Hospital, Kensington, London;

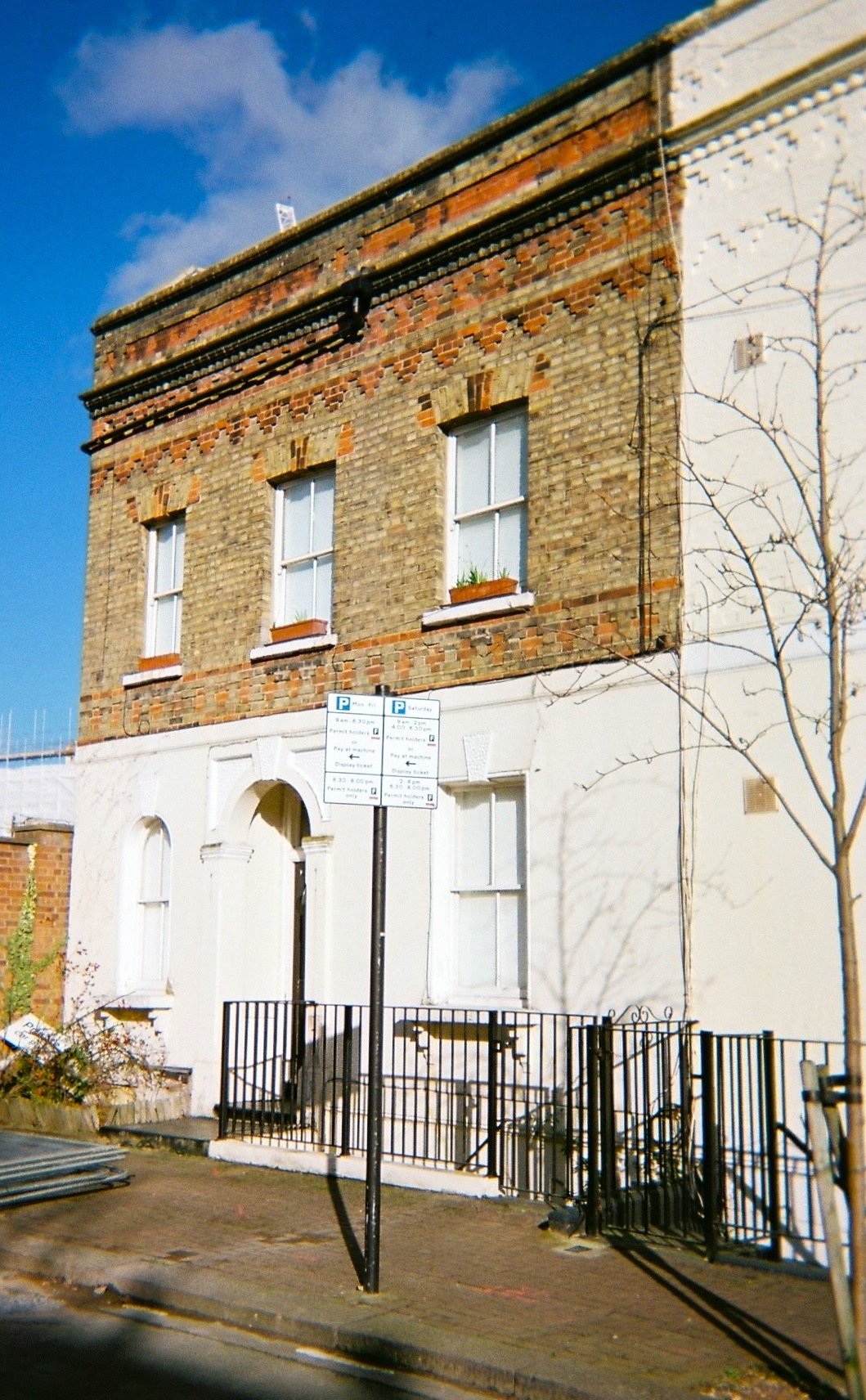
Polychromatic brick and stucco house (1865) in Empress Place, opposite to the house where composer William Hurlstone was born in 1876

By 1845 he was architect and surveyor to the City and Camden Town (Birmingham Junction) Railway Company and continued with extensive design projects: The Ebbw Vale Co. in Dowgate by the Thames Docks, 1845, The Religious Tract Society's quarters at 56 Paternoster Row, 12 Little Britain, schools in Cripplegate, Tower Hill and Hackney. In the City, his striking warehouse at 23–25, Eastcheap on the corner with Philpot Lane, in Lombardic Gothic style, survives singled out by Nikolaus Pevsner as 'exceptional'. He was responsible for many improvements in the City of London. Outside the City, he designed the original Cancer Hospital in Fulham Road in 1859. Edward Walford described the hospital thus: "The building, which was founded in 1851, is constructed of plain white Suffolk bricks, relieved with bands of red bricks, and keystones and cornices of terra-cotta. The principal ground floor, approached by a flight of steps, contains the hall and a handsome stone staircase, apartments for the house surgeon and medical officers, and wards for patients."

Down the Old Brompton Road, Young designed shops and terraced houses for the professional and working class influx in Fulham, Richmond (now Empress) Place, birth place in 1876 of composer, William Hurlstone, and along the Richmond (Lillie) Road, 1863–1866, residences in Roehampton, and cottages in Pear Gardens, Southwark. Among the country mansions he designed is the Italianate Laughton Park in East Sussex for Sir James Duke, Lord Mayor of London. He restored churches in his native Suffolk.

Young's assistants included Alfred Millwood, David Mocatta and Frederick Hyde Pownall from 1862 to 1867.

== Legacy ==
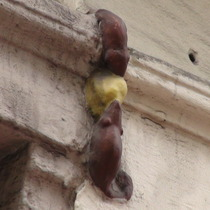
Young & Son's Carved mice on wall in Eastcheap

Young was widowed in 1873, however, he was still working in 1875 surveying dangerous structures in the City as is attested by the Metropolitan Board of Works. Apart from the strikingly ornate civic and commercial buildings he designed, Young's legacy, especially in the City of London, was to ensure in his role as surveyor, that buildings falling into disrepair would be adequately put right and on several occasions, he asked for 'substitutions' with surveyor colleagues so that he could personally superintend the repairs as an architect, notably in Houndsditch and Cannon Street. John Young left a quiet token of his sense of humour in the carved mice on the parapet of a warehouse in Eastcheap. He died at home in St Mary's Lodge in March 1877. He and his wife were buried in the churchyard of St Mary Stoke Newington.

His son, John, continued John Young & Son, specialising in civic and church architecture, possibly designing St Mary and St Modwen Church, Burton-on-Trent. He was a friend of the novelist, George Thackeray and became a Fellow of the British Institute of Architects, a distinction that had eluded his energetic father. John Young Junior died in 1910 in Brentwood, Essex.

== Gallery ==
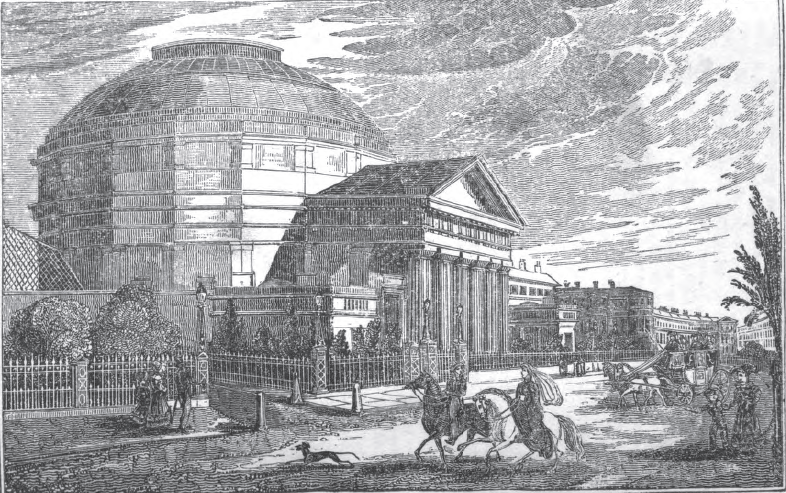
The Colosseum, Regent's Park, London (1827–74)

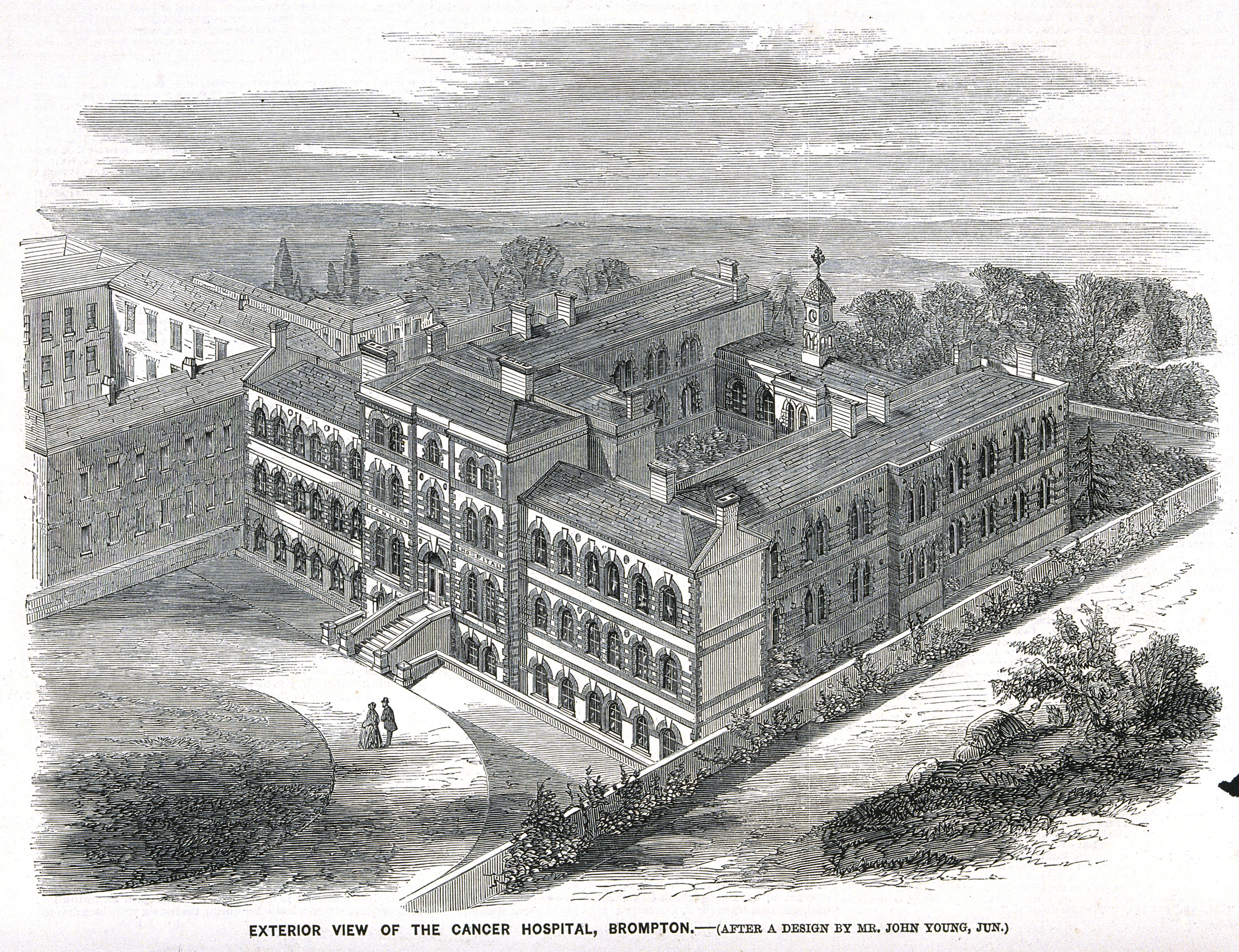
Brompton Cancer Hospital, Kensington, London; aerial view, (1859)

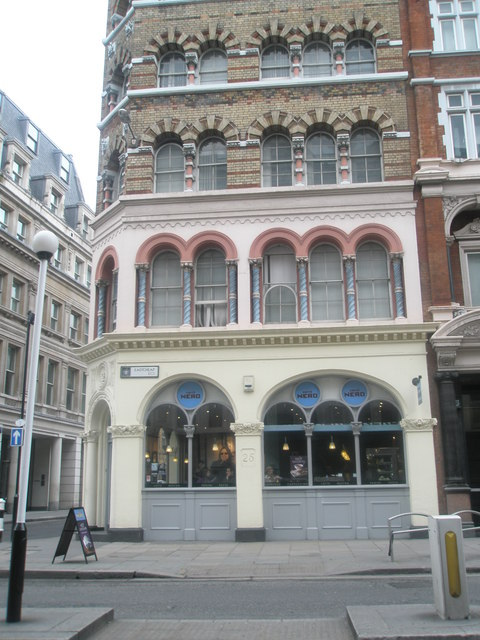
Caffè Nero at 23 Eastcheap (1861-2)

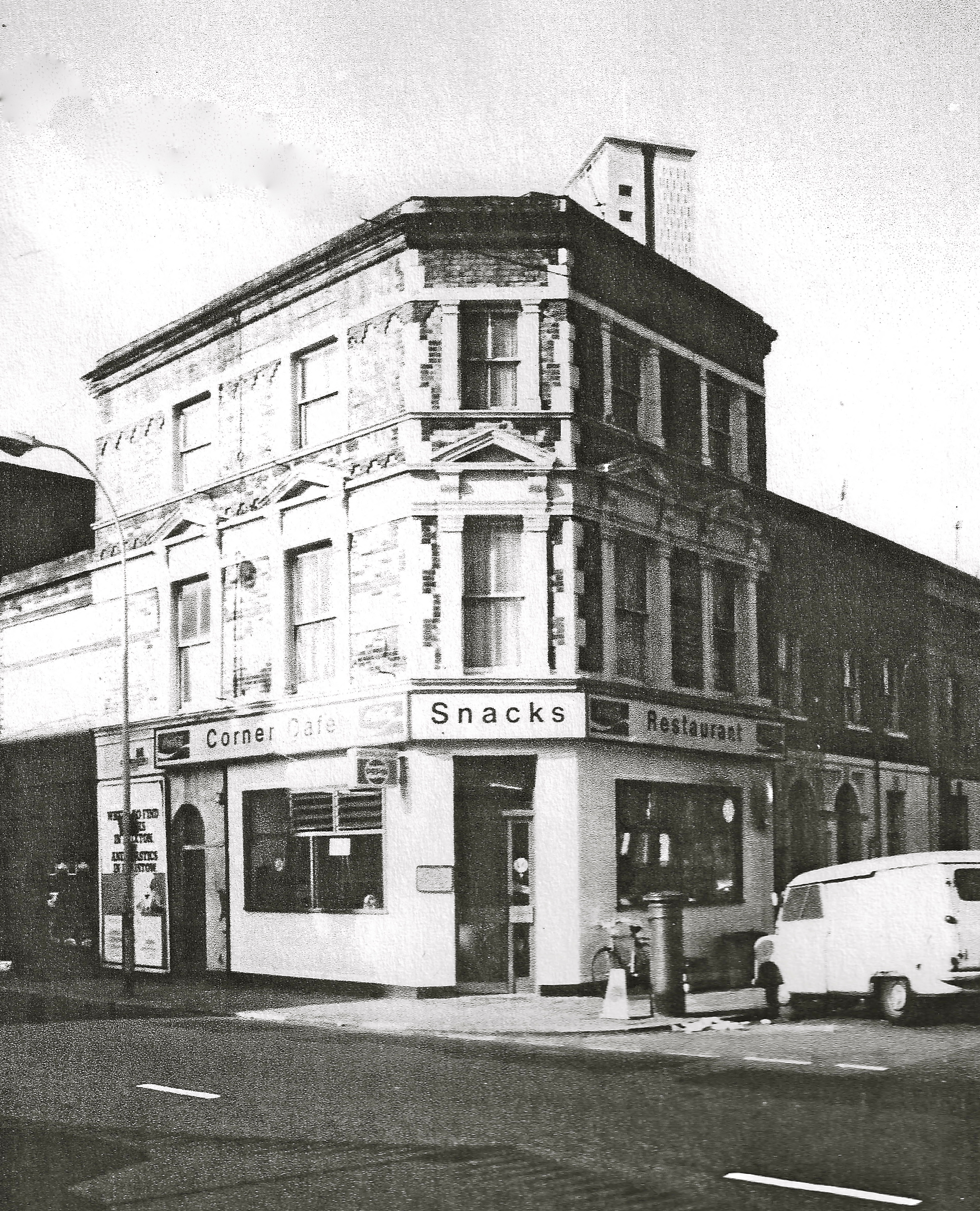
Corner 19th c. shop building in Empress Place/Lillie Road, Fulham

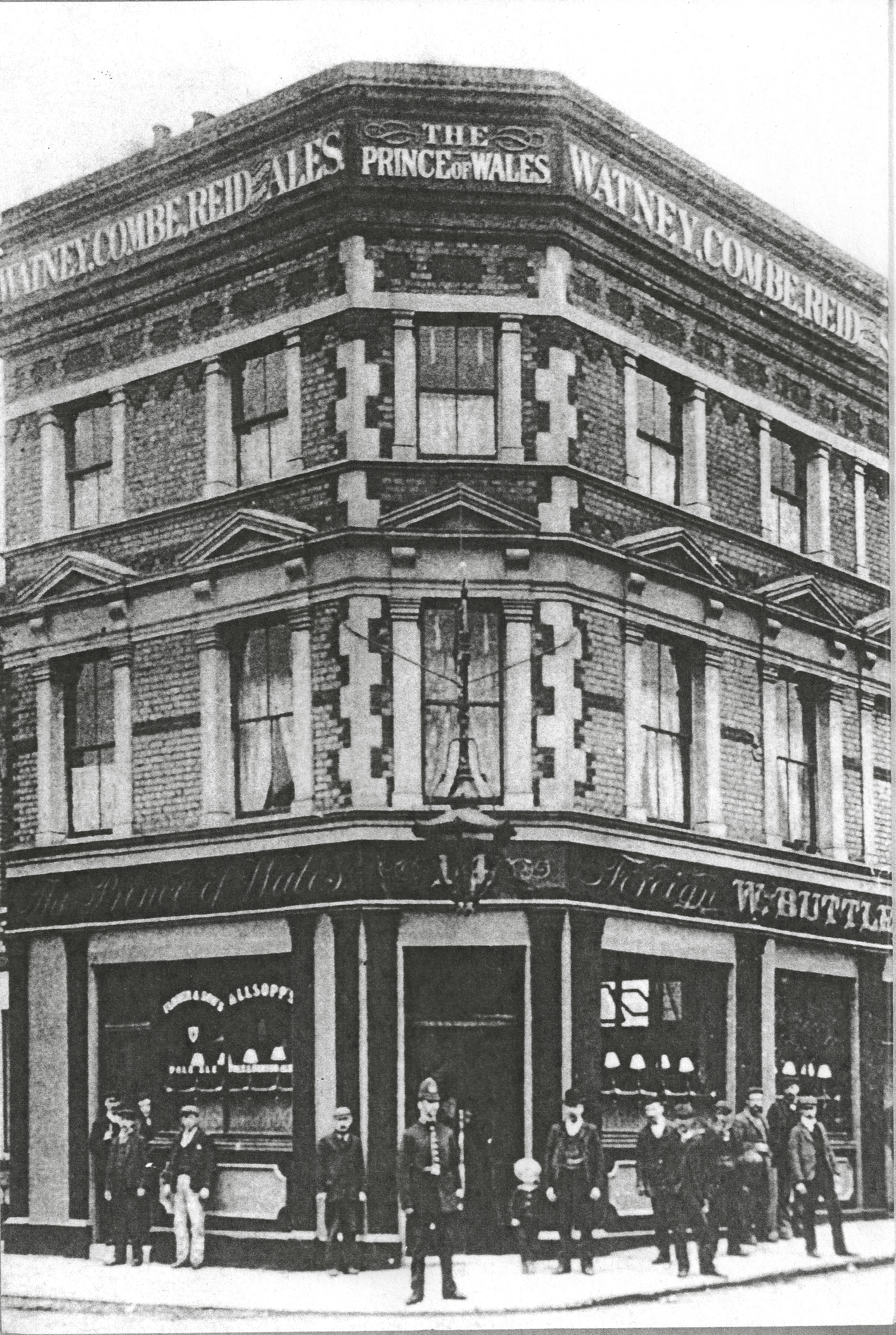
Young's 1865 polychromatic brickwork (demolished 1938 for new 'Prince of Wales' pub, currently "The Prince")

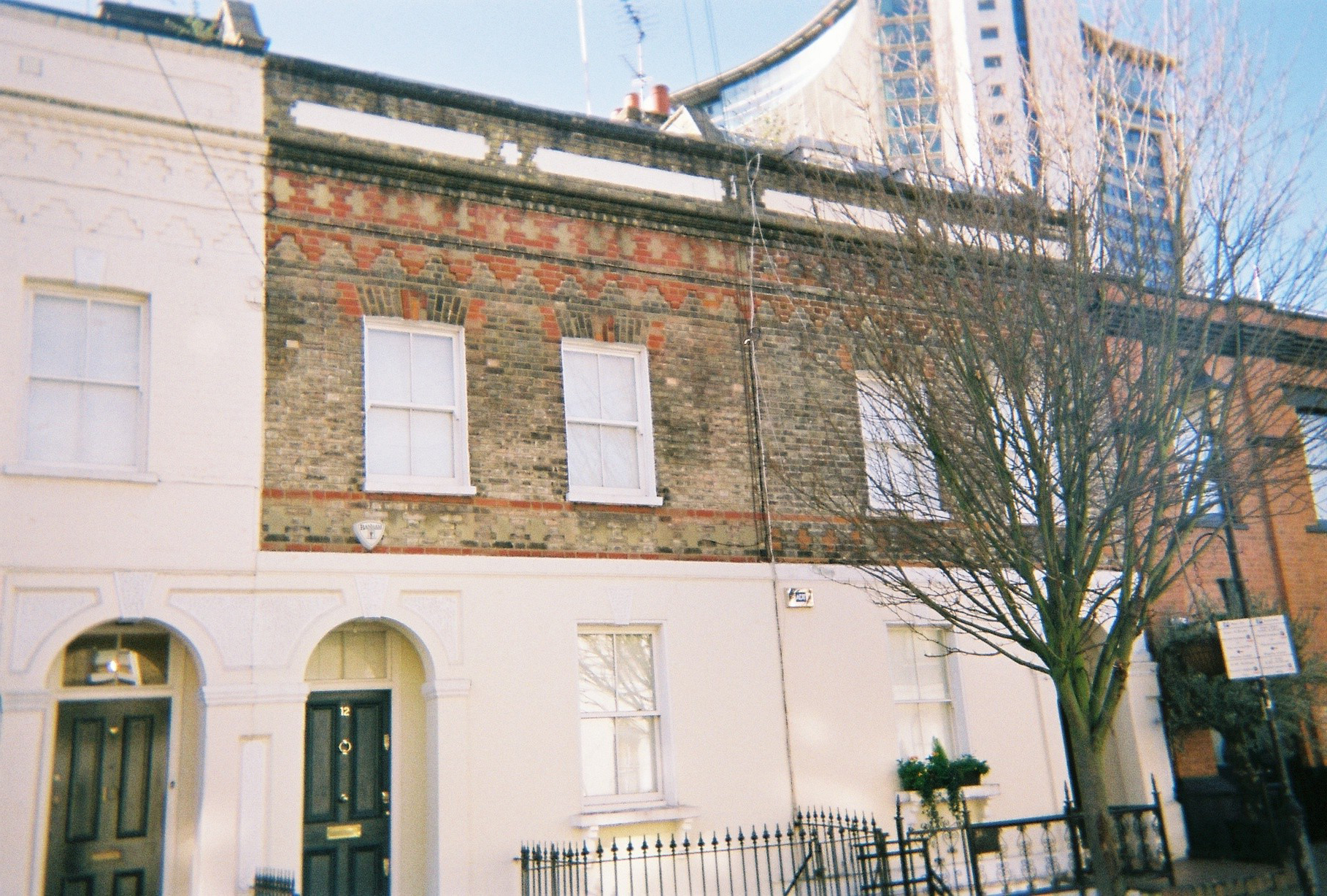
Vernacular housing in Fulham (1865)
