= St Modwen's, Burton upon Trent =

Coordinates: 52.8014°N 1.6292°W

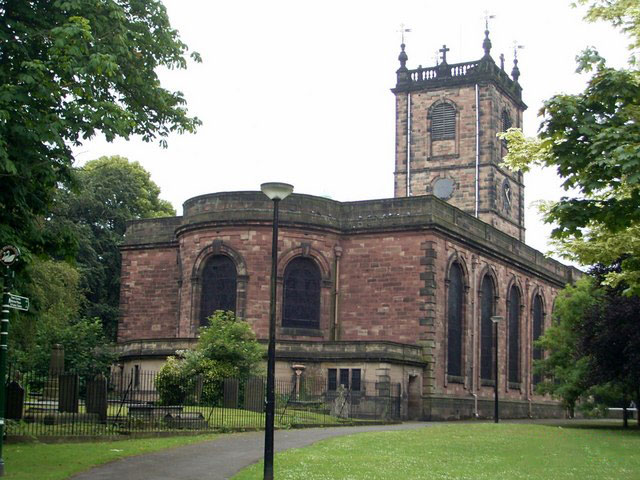
- St Modwen's, Burton upon Trent
- Denomination: Church of England
- Churchmanship: Broad Church
- Website: St Modwen's webpage

History
- Founded: 1719; 307 years ago
- Dedication: 1723; 303 years ago

Administration
- Province: Province of Canterbury
- Diocese: Diocese of Lichfield
- Archdeaconry: Archdeaconry of Stoke
- Deanery: Tutbury
- Parish: Burton-upon-Trent St Modwen

St Modwen's is a Church of England parish church situated in Burton upon Trent in Staffordshire, England. It is part of the Diocese of Lichfield. The church is dedicated to St Modwen, or Modwenna, a nun who founded an abbey at Burton in the 7th century.

It replaced the remains of the church of Burton Abbey which was used by the town after the dissolution of the abbey.

== St Modwen's New Church ==
The current church building, which overlooks Burton's market square, was begun in 1719, first used for services in 1723, and finally completed by 1728. It is built in red sandstone and comprises an aisled five-bay nave with galleries on the north, west, and south, an apse, and a western narthex with central tower, north and south gallery stairs, and internal porch. Designed in a Classical style by the brothers Richard and William Smith of Tettenhall, it is similar to St Alkmund's Church at Whitchurch, Shropshire, built by William to the designs of John Barker. William died in 1724 and Richard in 1726, and the church was completed by their younger brother Francis Smith of Warwick. In the 1730s Richard Wilkes, a Staffordshire antiquary, described the church as 'elegant and beautiful', giving 'pleasure to all that behold or enter it'. The west tower is of three stages and has a balustrade with urns and round windows with radial glazing bars. The apse has wide Doric pilasters at the opening and between the windows. The nave arcades have tall Doric piers without an entablature, the flat ceiling has a deep cove, and the nave galleries cut across the high, arched windows of the aisles.

The church is Grade I listed and contains a 15th-century font, an organ case built in 1771 for an organ made by John Snetzler and a monument to Lady Fowler by Sir Richard Westmacott of 1825.

Anthony Greatorex was the organist at St Modwen's from 1771 and was succeeded as organist by his son, the composer Thomas Greatorex. His son, Thomas the younger, went on to be organist at Holy Trinity, Burton upon Trent.

Regular service are on Sunday mornings at 11 am: Holy Communion (first and third Sundays) and Matins (second and fourth); and Wednesdays at 1045: Holy Communion (1662). The church is open most Saturdays between 1000 and 1200 when refreshments are available.

The vicar is also vicar of St Paul's and St Aidan's.

== See also ==
- Grade I listed churches in Staffordshire
- Listed buildings in Burton (civil parish)
