= Henry Maull =

British photographer (1829–1914)

- Born: 1829; England, UK
- Died: 1914 (aged 84–85); England, UK
- Known for: Photography

Henry Maull (1829–1914) was a British photographer who specialised in portraits of noted individuals.

== Biography ==
Maull was born in Clerkenwell, London, as the son of a tradesman. He married Eliza (born Islington 1831) and became a member of the Royal Photographic Society in 1870.

Henry Maull formed several partnerships during his career:

- 1856 – 8 March 1865: Maull & Polyblank in partnership with George Henry Polyblank. Other sources say it was established in 1854.
- 1866–1872: Maull, Henry & Co

John Young architect and surveyor, 1873

- 1873–1878: Maull & Co

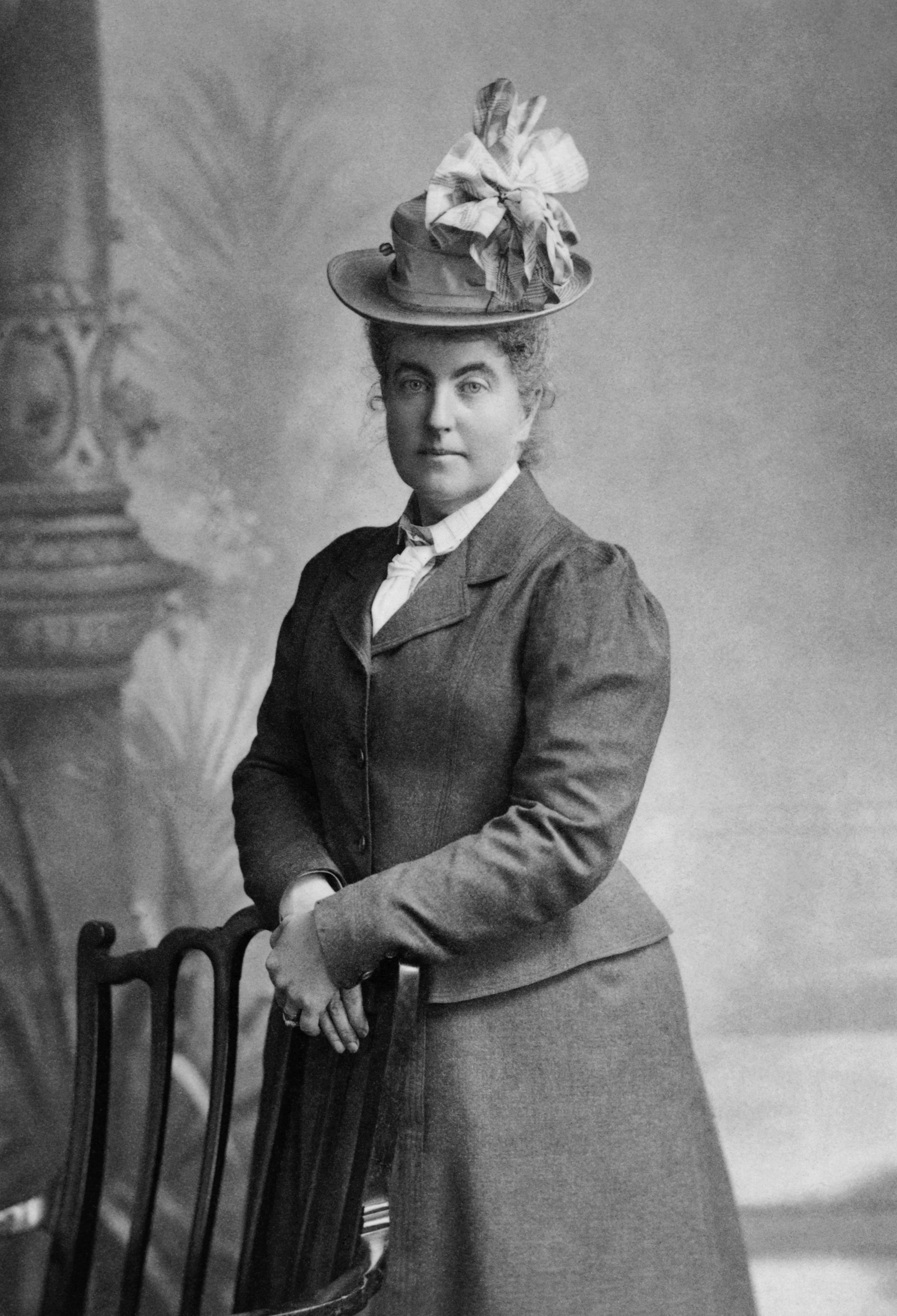
c. 1900 "Maull & Fox" portrait of Fanny Bullock Workman.

- 1879–1885: Maull & Fox, in partnership with John Fox (1832–1907). The studio continued under the original name by others and moved to 200 Gray's Inn Road. It was officially closed on 26 October 1928 and the final creditors' meeting was held on 30 November 1928. The firm was taken over by the Graphic Photo Union, which in turn was taken over by Kemsley Newspapers.

Maull operated studios at the following locations:

1. 62 Cheapside, City of London, March 1865 – 1871.
2. Tavistock House, 252 Fulham Road, Chelsea, March 1865 – 1869.
3. 187a Piccadilly, Westminster, March 1865 – 1871.

== Works ==
- Portraits of Members of Parliament by Maull and Polyblank, 163 photographs
- Portraits of Victorian scientists, engineers, explorers etc, 58 photographs
- Portraits of noted individuals, which were frequently published as engravings in the Illustrated London News
- Photographs of Fellows from the mid-nineteenth century until the early twentieth century.

=== Photographic Portraits of Living Celebrities ===
Photographic Portraits of Living Celebrities was published from 1856 to 1859, featuring forty individual portraits with accompanying biographies by Herbert Fry, Pts 1–4; later parts by Edward Walford, issued to subscribers over a period of forty-one months and eventually all published in a single volume (London, W. Kent, 1859. Vol. I).

The issues published were:

1. May 1856. Professor Owen
2. June 1856. Thomas Babington Macaulay, 1st Baron Macaulay
3. July 1856. Robert Stephenson
4. August 1856. John Arthur Roebuck
5. September 1856. Sir Benjamin Collins Brodie, 2nd Baronet
6. October 1856. Edward Hodges Baily
7. November 1856. Samuel Warren (British lawyer)
8. December 1856. Professor Thomas Graham
9. January 1857. Edward Matthew Ward
10. February 1857. Lord Campbell
11. March 1857. George Cruikshank
12. April 1857. Rowland Hill
13. May 1857. Sir William Fenwick Williams
14. June 1857. William P. Frith
15. July 1857. Cardinal Wiseman
16. August 1857. Lord Brougham
17. September 1857. Martin Farquhar Tupper
18. October 1857. Michael Faraday
19. November 1857. John Gibson (sculptor)
20. December 1857. Earl of Rosse
21. January 1858. Charles Kean
22. February 1858. William Ewart Gladstone
23. March 1858. Sir Archibald Alison
24. April 1858. William Sterndale Bennett
25. May 1858. David Livingstone
26. June 1858. Earl of Aberdeen
27. July 1858. Daniel Maclise
28. August 1858. Lord Stanley
29. September 1858. Dr Tait, Bishop of London (later Archbishop of Canterbury)
30. October 1858. Austen Henry Layard
31. November 1858. Clarkson Stanfield
32. December 1858. Lord Panmure
33. January 1859. John Baldwin Buckstone
34. February 1859. Comte de Montalambert
35. March 1859. Samuel Lover
36. April 1859. Lord John Manners
37. May 1859. Bishop of Oxford Samuel Wilberforce
38. June 1859. Sir John Lawrence
39. July 1859. Lord Colchester
40. August 1859. Archbishop of Canterbury John Bird Sumner
