= Modwenna =

Nun and saint in England

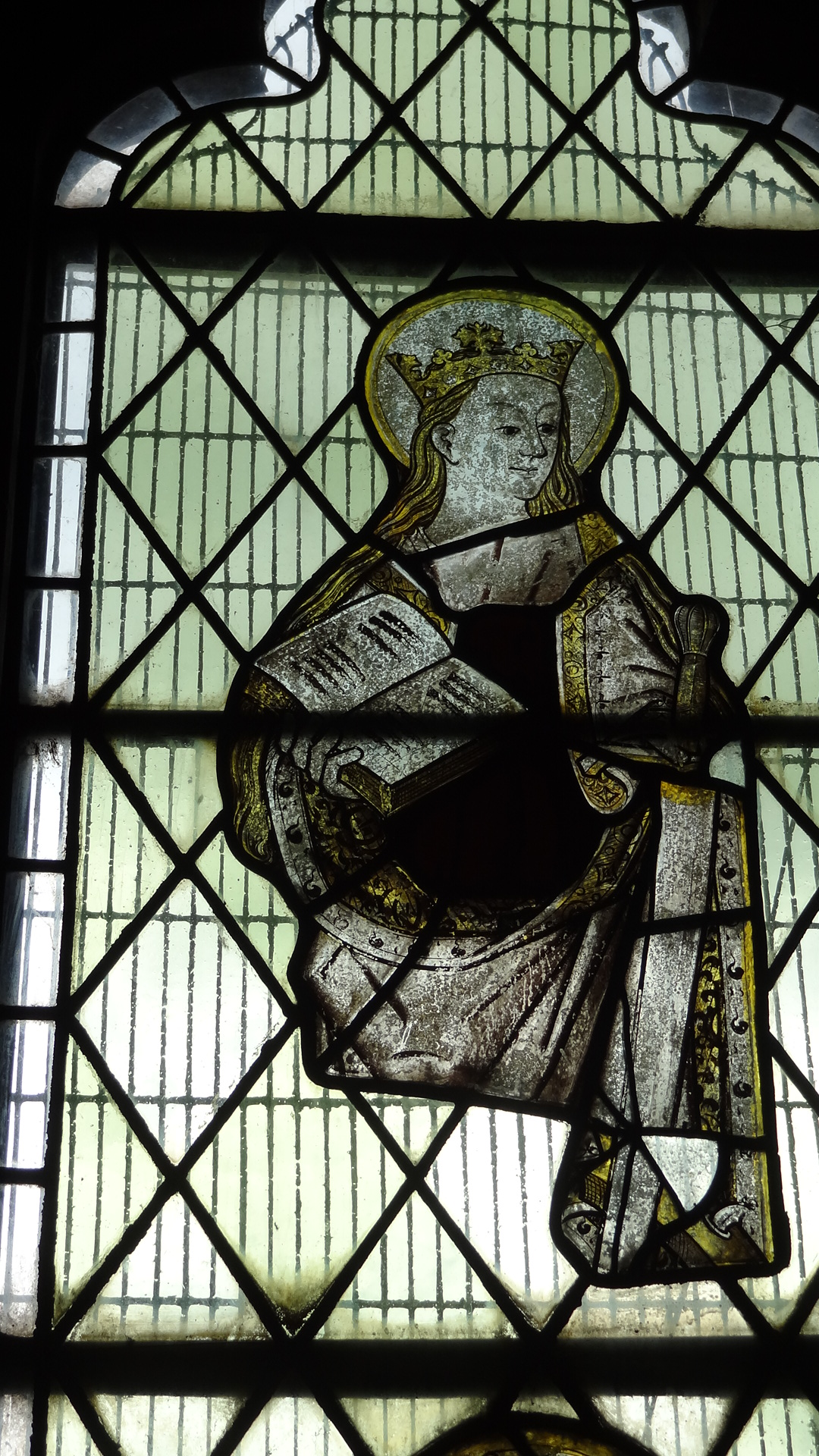
Medieval stained glass image of Modwenna, taken from Burton Abbey to Whittington

Modwenna, or Modwen, was a nun and saint in England, who founded Burton Abbey in Staffordshire in the 7th century.

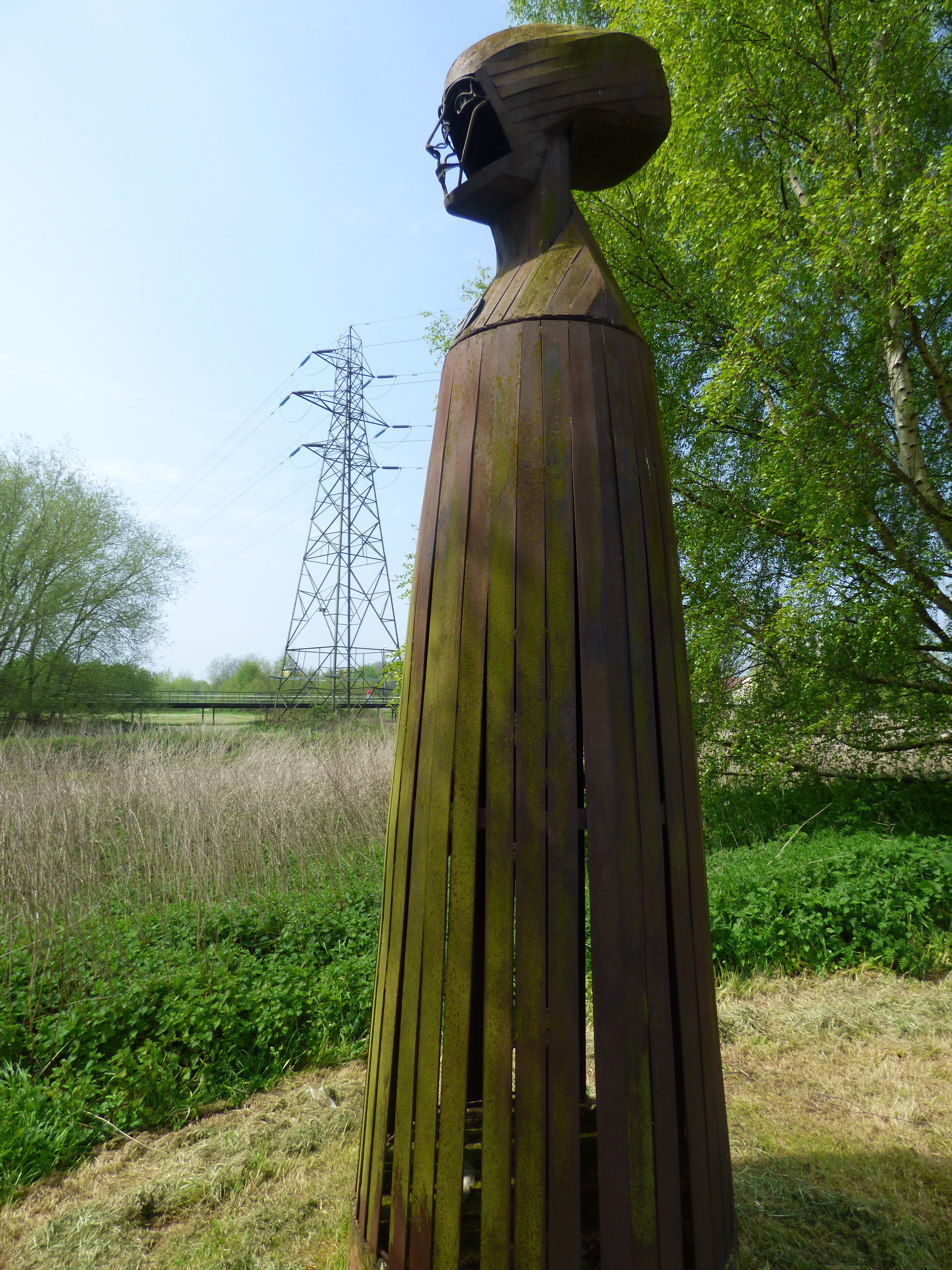
Modern statue

According to the medieval Life of St Modwenna she was an Irish noblewoman by birth and founded the abbey on an island in the River Trent.

Modwenna is reported to have performed many holy miracles at Burton Abbey, and to this day the well on the site is said to have healing properties. After a time Modwenna left Burton-upon-Trent and travelled to Scotland where she died in Langfortin, near Dundee, reportedly at the age of 130. Her body was returned to Burton-upon-Trent for burial. Another abbess and saint, Osyth (died 700), was raised under Modwenna's direction.

Others, however, say that she has been confused with St Monenna (Moninne) of Ireland and with a Scottish saint also called Modwenna, said to have established seven churches in Scotland, including one in Longforgan, near Dundee, and that the Anglo-Norman text of her life has little historical value. This may be how she comes to be associated with Alfred the Great, whom she is said to have known, even though he lived in the 9th century, some two hundred years later.

St Modwen's, Burton upon Trent is dedicated to her as is the chapel at Pillaton Hall and the Catholic St Mary and St Modwen Church, Burton-on-Trent.
