= St Mary and St Modwen Church, Burton-on-Trent =

St Mary and St Modwen Church
- St Mary and St Modwen Catholic Church
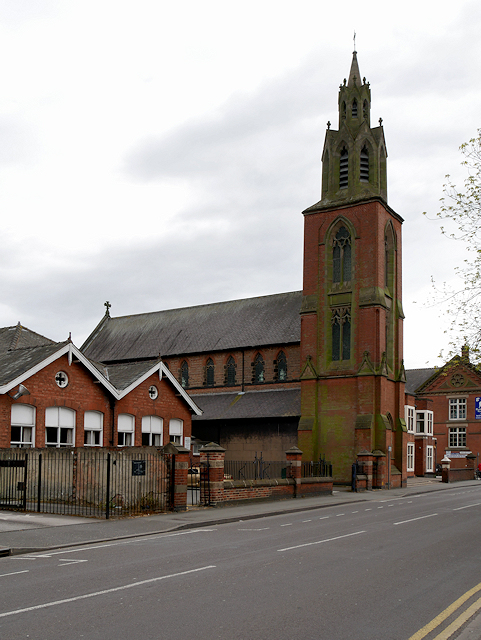
- St Mary and St Modwen Church
- 52.805°N 1.633°W
- OS grid reference: SK 24822 23119
- Location: Burton upon Trent
- Country: England
- Denomination: Roman Catholic
- Website: MaryandModwen.org.uk

History
- Status: Parish church
- Dedication: Saint Mary, Saint Modwen

Architecture
- Functional status: Active
- Heritage designation: Grade II listed
- Designated: 22 February 2016
- Architect: John Edgar Young
- Style: Gothic Revival
- Groundbreaking: 16 May 1878
- Completed: 27 August 1879
- Construction cost: £4,000

Administration
- Province: Birmingham
- Archdiocese: Birmingham
- Deanery: Lichfield and Walsall
- Parish: Burton on Trent

St Mary and St Modwen Church is a Roman Catholic parish church in Burton upon Trent, Staffordshire, England. It was built from 1878 to 1879, to designs possibly by John Edgar Young in the Gothic Revival style. The church is on Guild Street in the town centre. It is a Grade II listed building.

== History ==
=== Foundation ===
After the Reformation, a notable recusant in Burton was Thomas Paget, 3rd Baron Paget who died in 1590. Over the following two centuries a number of Catholics in Burton were fined. In 1794, St Francis de Sales Chapel was built in Yoxall and Catholics travelled there from Burton to celebrate Mass. In the 1830s, a mission was started in Burton from Yoxall by the priest Fr James Jeffries. Initially, the mission was in a malt house behind the Crown pub on the High Street. Later it was in a cottage behind the Old White Lion on the corner of Lichfield Street and Fleet Street. Fr Jeffries' successor, Fr Patrick O'Sullivan bought the current site of the church. On the site, a Gothic Revival building that combined a school and a chapel was built. In June 1852, the chapel was opened.

=== Construction ===
With the increasing local Catholic population of Burton, a new larger church needed to be built. The priest, Fr C. McCabe commissioned a Mr Young of London to plan a new church. According to Historic England, this possibly was John Edgar Young, the son of John Young. Archibald Matthias Dunn was consulted about building the church, but his design was rejected for being too expensive. Instead, J. Knight Morley, who previously worked with E. W. Pugin, was asked about the church and he modified Young's plans. On 16 May 1878, the foundation stone was laid by the Bishop of Birmingham William Bernard Ullathorne. Construction of the church was done by Messrs Lowe and Sons and was delayed by the late delivery of columns made of Connemara marble. On 27 August 1879, the church was opened in a ceremony where Cardinal Henry Manning, Archbishop of Westminster, preached. The church cost £4,000 and was partially funded by Francis Mosley Spilsbury from Willington. The high altar was carved by John Roddis of Birmingham. In 1898, the altar in the Sacred Heart chapel was installed. In 1901, the altar in the Lady Chapel was added. Both altars were built by Richard Lockwood Boulton. In 1902, the chapel windows were installed. They were built by Franz Mayer of Munich. In 1910, the original school-chapel was replaced by a new school that later became the current parish centre.

== Parish ==
St Mary and St Modwen Church has its own parish. The church has three Sunday Masses at 9:00am, 11:00am and 6:00pm.

== See also ==
- Archdiocese of Birmingham
