= Birmingham Corporation Water Department =

Defunct utilities supplier for Birmingham, England

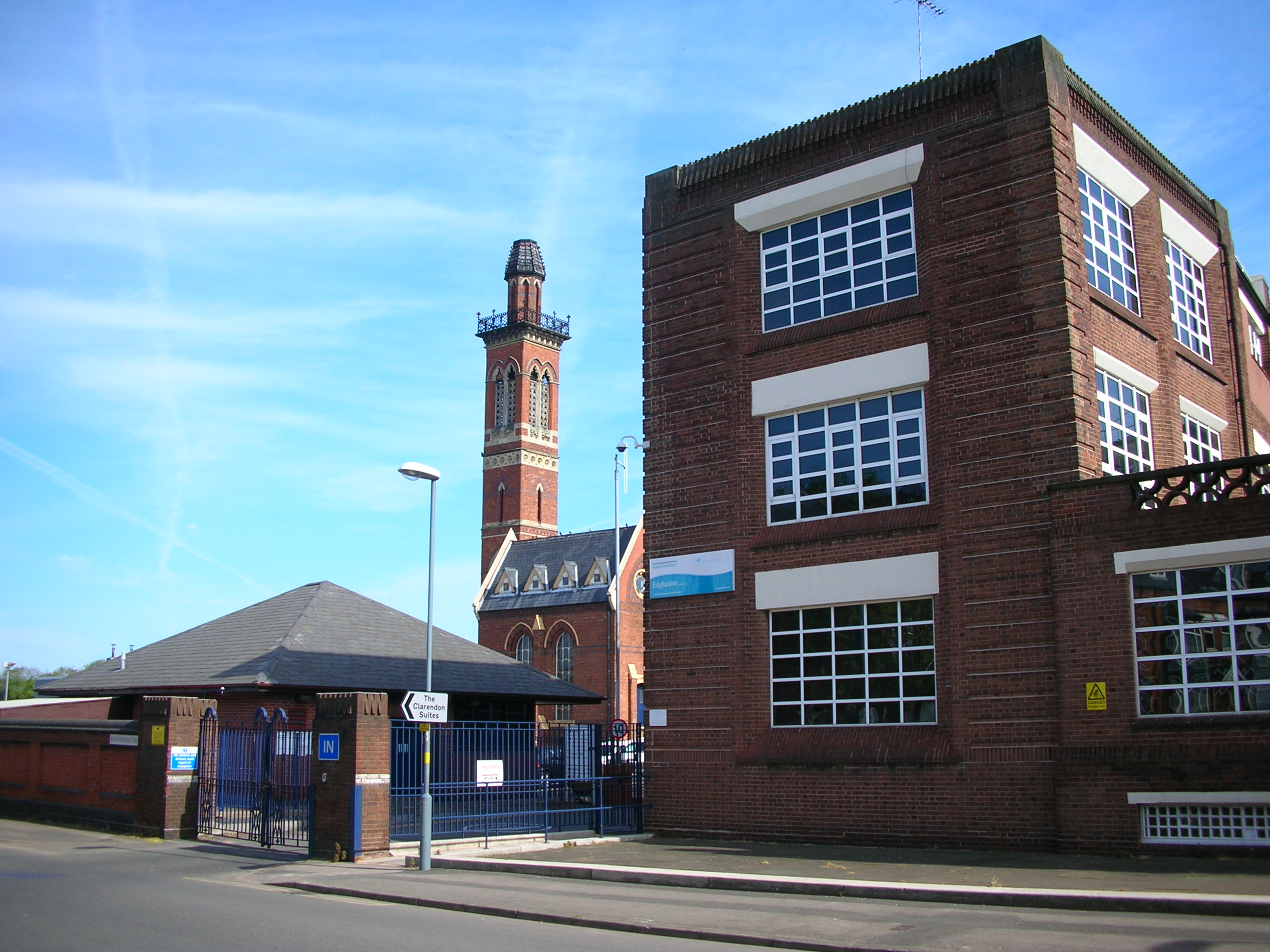
- Birmingham Waterworks Tower by John Henry Chamberlain
- Predecessor: Birmingham Waterworks Company
- Successor: Severn Trent Water Authority
- Formation: 1876
- Dissolved: 1974
- Location: Birmingham, England
- Region served: City of Birmingham
- Parent organization: Birmingham City Council

The Birmingham Corporation Water Department was responsible for the supply of water to Birmingham, England, from 1876 to 1974. It was also known as Birmingham Corporation Waterworks Department.

== Early history 1808–1876 ==
Birmingham Water Act 1826
- Act of Parliament
- Parliament of the United Kingdom
- Long title: An Act for supplying with Water the Town and Neighbourhood of Birmingham in the County of Warwick.
- Citation: 7 Geo. 4. c. cix

Dates
- Royal assent: 26 May 1826

Other legislation
- Repealed by: Birmingham Waterworks Act 1855

Status: Repealed

Text of statute as originally enacted

Birmingham Waterworks (Capital) Act 1854
- Act of Parliament
- Parliament of the United Kingdom
- Long title: An Act to enable the Company of Proprietors of the Birmingham Waterworks to raise further Money.
- Citation: 17 & 18 Vict. c. xxxvii

Dates
- Royal assent: 2 June 1854

Other legislation
- Repealed by: Birmingham Waterworks Act 1855

Status: Repealed

Text of statute as originally enacted

Birmingham Waterworks Act 1855
- Act of Parliament
- Parliament of the United Kingdom
- Long title: An Act to enable the Company of Proprietors of the Birmingham Waterworks to construct new Waterworks; and for other Purposes.
- Citation: 18 & 19 Vict. c. xxxiv

Dates
- Royal assent: 25 May 1855

Other legislation
- Repealed by: Birmingham Corporation (Consolidation) Act 1883

Status: Repealed

Text of statute as originally enacted

The earliest formal supply of water was offered by the Birmingham Waterworks Company. In 1808 notice of a bill was given in Parliament for a scheme to provide Birmingham with an organised supply of water. It was opposed, and in 1809 a meeting considered the proposal, appointed a committee, and rejected the idea of the waterworks. A second bill was rejected in 1811. It was not until 1826 that Parliament passed the Birmingham Water Act 1826 (7 Geo. 4. c. cix), which granted powers constituting

the Company of Proprietors of the Birmingham Waterworks for the purpose of providing a sufficient and constant supply of good and wholesome water for domestic, manufacturing and other purposes

The area to be supplied used only the River Tame. The initial supply was intermittent. In 1849, the corporation made an agreement with the company for a constant supply in certain districts. By 1853 a constant supply was universal.

The Grade II listed Birmingham Waterworks Tower at Edgbaston Waterworks was designed by John Henry Chamberlain and built in 1870. There is no connection to the nearby Edgbaston Reservoir, built to feed local canals, a hundred years previously.

By 1873 the total quantity supplied was around 3,000 million imperial gallons (14,000,000 m^{3}) per annum.

== Birmingham Corporation Water Department ==
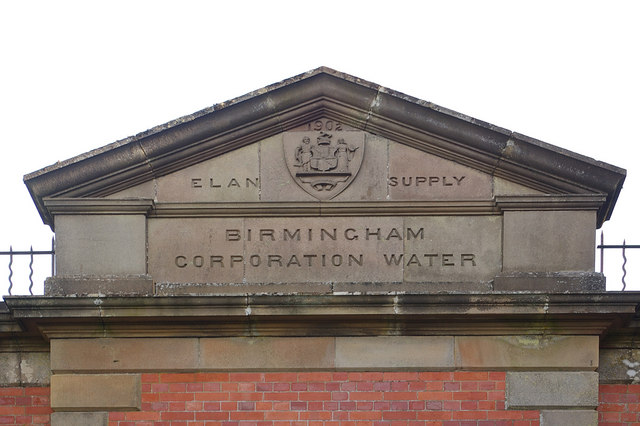
Pediment of Elan Aqueduct valve house with "Birmingham Corporation Water" wording

=== Early developments ===
Birmingham (Corporation) Water Act 1875
- Act of Parliament
- Parliament of the United Kingdom
- Long title: An Act for empowering the Mayor, Aldermen, and Burgesses of the Borough of Birmingham, in the county of Warwick, to purchase the Undertaking of the Company of Proprietors of the Birmingham Waterworks; and for other purposes.
- Citation: 38 & 39 Vict. c. clxxxviii

Dates
- Royal assent: 2 August 1875

Other legislation
- Repealed by: Birmingham Corporation (Consolidation) Act 1883

Status: Repealed

Text of statute as originally enacted

The Birmingham (Corporation) Water Act 1875 (38 & 39 Vict. c. clxxxviii) empowered Birmingham Corporation to purchase the Birmingham Waterworks Company. The transaction was supervised by the Mayor of Birmingham, Joseph Chamberlain, and completed on 1 January 1876 for the sum of £1,350,000 (equivalent to £134,680,860 in 2025). Chamberlain declared to a House of Commons committee

We have not the slightest intention of making profit... We shall get our profit indirectly in the comfort of the town and in the health of the inhabitants

The rivers Bourne and Blythe, Plant's Brook and Perry Stream were used as sources. The corporation dug six wells at Aston, Short Heath, King's Vale, Perry Barr, Selly Oak (Selly Oak Pumping Station survives), and Longbridge. These provided 20 million imperial gallons (91,000 m^{3}) per day. There were 14 reservoirs (including Aston Reservoir, Perry Barr, Witton Lakes and Brookvale) with a total capacity of 628.5 million imperial gallons (2,857,000 m^{3}).

By 1891, population growth in the city was causing demand for water to outstrip supply.

=== Elan aqueduct ===
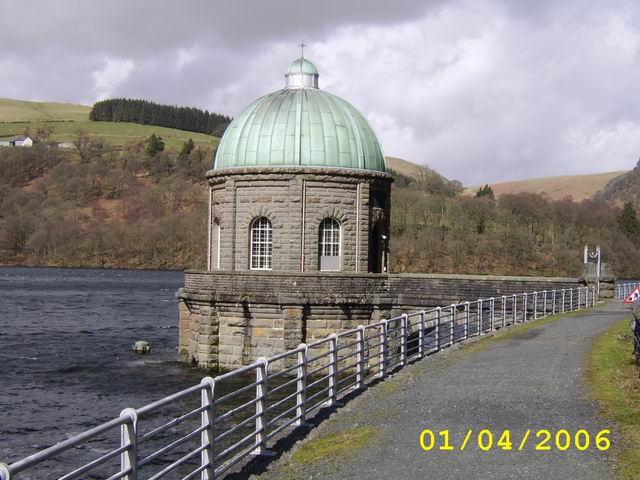
Foel Tower in the Elan Valley

The Birmingham Corporation Water Act 1892 (55 & 56 Vict. c. clxxiii) authorised the purchase of land in Mid Wales on the upper portion of the Rivers Elan and Claerwen. Three reservoirs on the Elan and three on the Claerwen (collectively the "Elan Valley Reservoirs") were authorised, together with an aqueduct to carry the water to Birmingham. The engineer for the Elan aqueduct scheme was James Mansergh. Construction work started in 1893 and the Elan Valley Railway was built to aid construction. King Edward VII and Queen Alexandra performed the official opening on 21 July 1904 although building works were not completed until near the end of 1906.

Birmingham Corporation Water Act 1902
- Act of Parliament
- Parliament of the United Kingdom
- Long title: An Act for extending the time limited by the Birmingham Corporation Water Act 1892 for the construction of certain of the works authorised by the said Act and for amending certain provisions of the said Act and for empowering the Corporation of Birmingham to acquire additional lands for the purposes of the said Act and for other purposes.
- Citation: 2 Edw. 7. c. xviii

Dates
- Royal assent: 28 April 1902

Other legislation
- Relates to: Birmingham Corporation Water Act 1892

The Elan aqueduct discharged into two reservoirs: Frankley Reservoir at Frankley and Bartley Reservoir at Bartley Green.

The capacity of the aqueduct was increased with work starting in 1919. By 1921, two 42-inch-diameter (1,100 mm) mains from Wales delivered about 25 million imperial gallons (110,000 m^{3}) per day.

== Later history ==
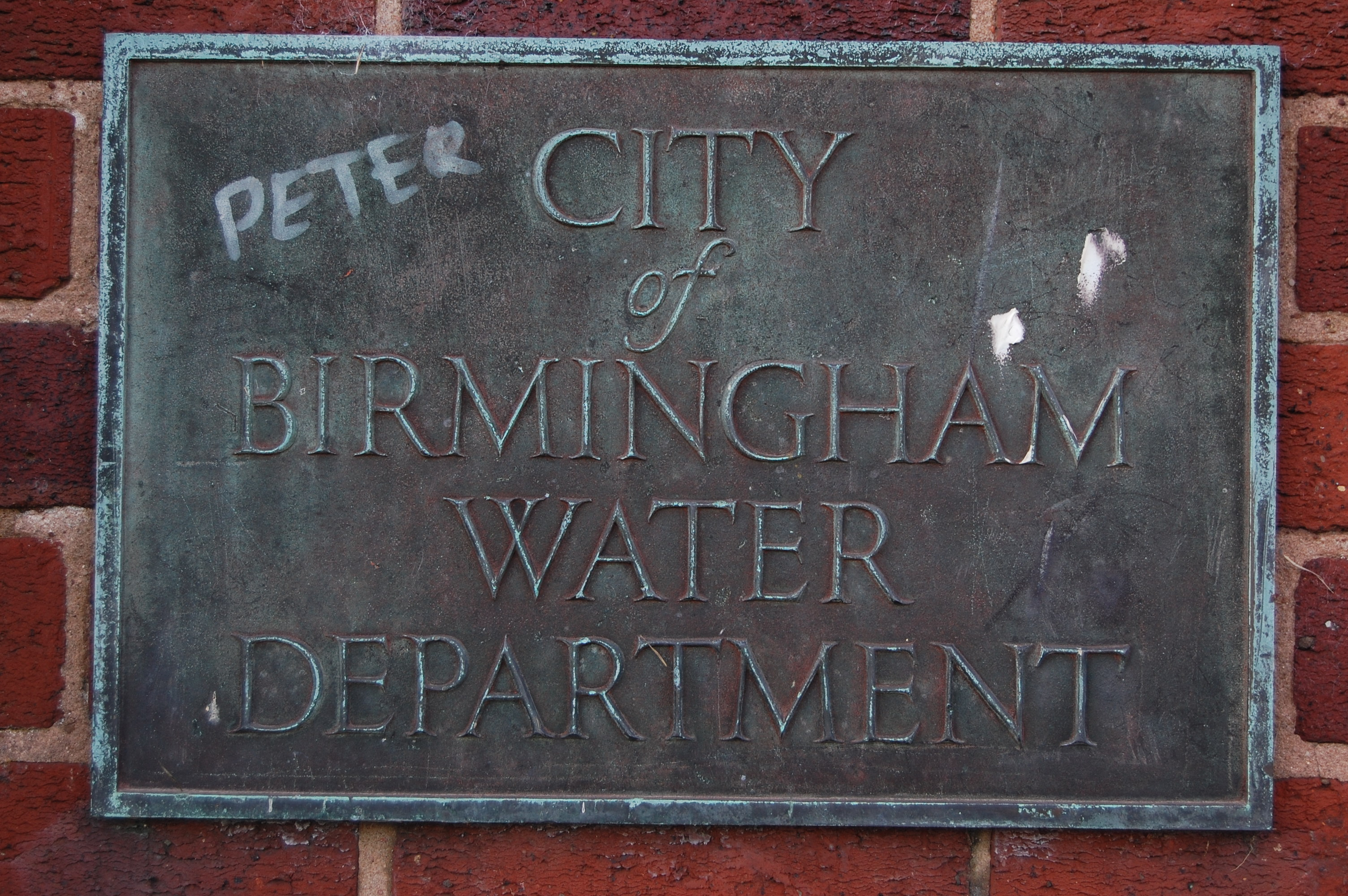
City of Birmingham Water Department sign at Perry Barr Reservoir

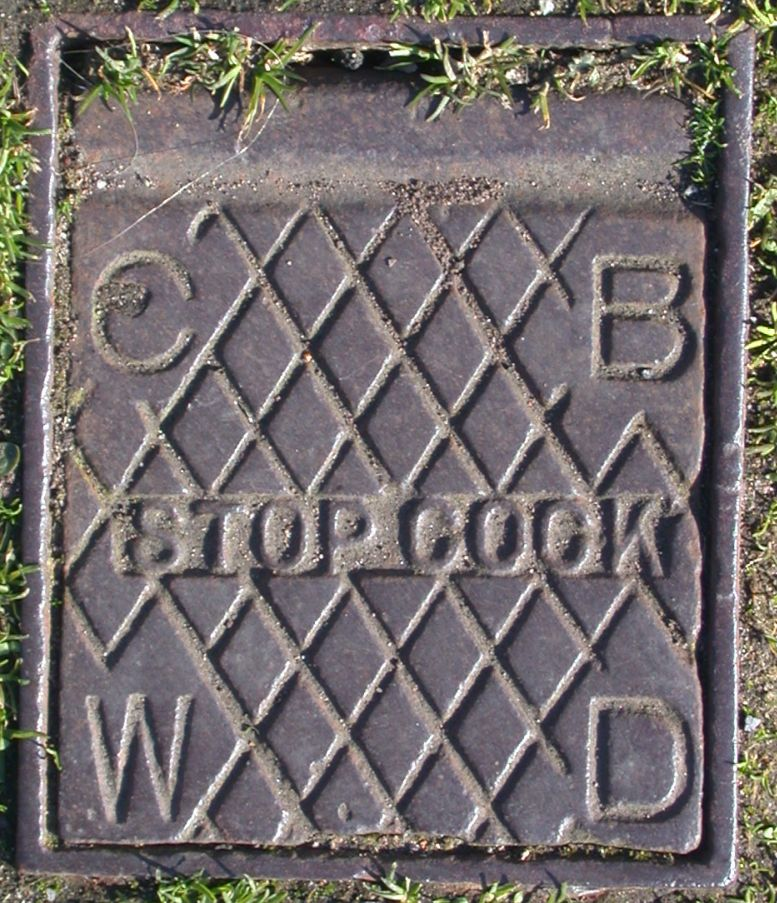
Domestic stopcock cover set into the pavement outside a house in north Birmingham, with the initials "CBWD"

Birmingham Corporation Water Department existed until 1974 when, under the Water Act 1973, its responsibilities were transferred to the Severn Trent Water Authority which is now Severn Trent Water.

The city council later took unsuccessful legal action to recover its lost investment.
