= New Frankley =

Civil parish in Birmingham, England

Coordinates: 52.403446°N 2.022783°W

- Location within the West Midlands
- Population: 7,890
- OS grid reference: SO985783
- Civil parish: New Frankley in Birmingham
- Metropolitan borough: Birmingham
- Metropolitan county: West Midlands
- Region: West Midlands
- Country: England
- Sovereign state: United Kingdom
- Post town: BIRMINGHAM
- Postcode district: B45
- Dialling code: 0121
- Police: West Midlands
- Fire: West Midlands
- Ambulance: West Midlands
- UK Parliament: Birmingham Northfield

New Frankley in Birmingham is a civil parish in Birmingham, England. As such, it has its own parish council.

== History ==
New Frankley was established in 2000 in an area in the south-west of the city south of Bartley Reservoir (map), transferred from Bromsgrove (and thus also from Hereford and Worcester to the West Midlands County) in 1995, which had previously been part of the Frankley parish.

== Description ==
The parish borders Frankley parish in Bromsgrove District to the north, the unparished area of Birmingham to the east, the unparished area of Rubery to the south, and Romsley parish to the west. According to the 2001 census the parish had a population of 7,890.

== Frankley Beeches ==
In 1930, Frankley Beeches, "a prominent viewpoint 800 ft above sea level", a small wood or beech copse from which the old Bournville factory was visible, was given by the Cadbury company to the National Trust in memory of Richard and George Cadbury.

== See also ==
- Frankley Reservoir
- Frankley Water Treatment Works
- King Edward VI Balaam Wood Academy
- Government of Birmingham, England
- Evolution of Worcestershire county boundaries
