= Bartley Reservoir =

Reservoir in the West Midlands, England

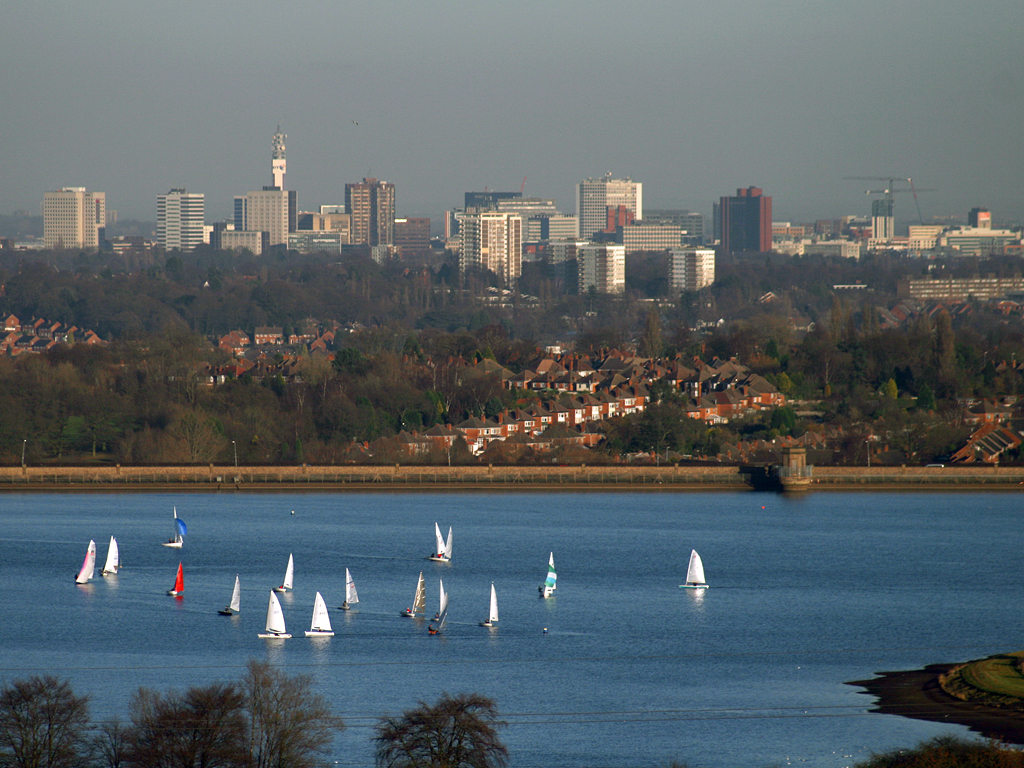
- with Birmingham city centre skyline in the background

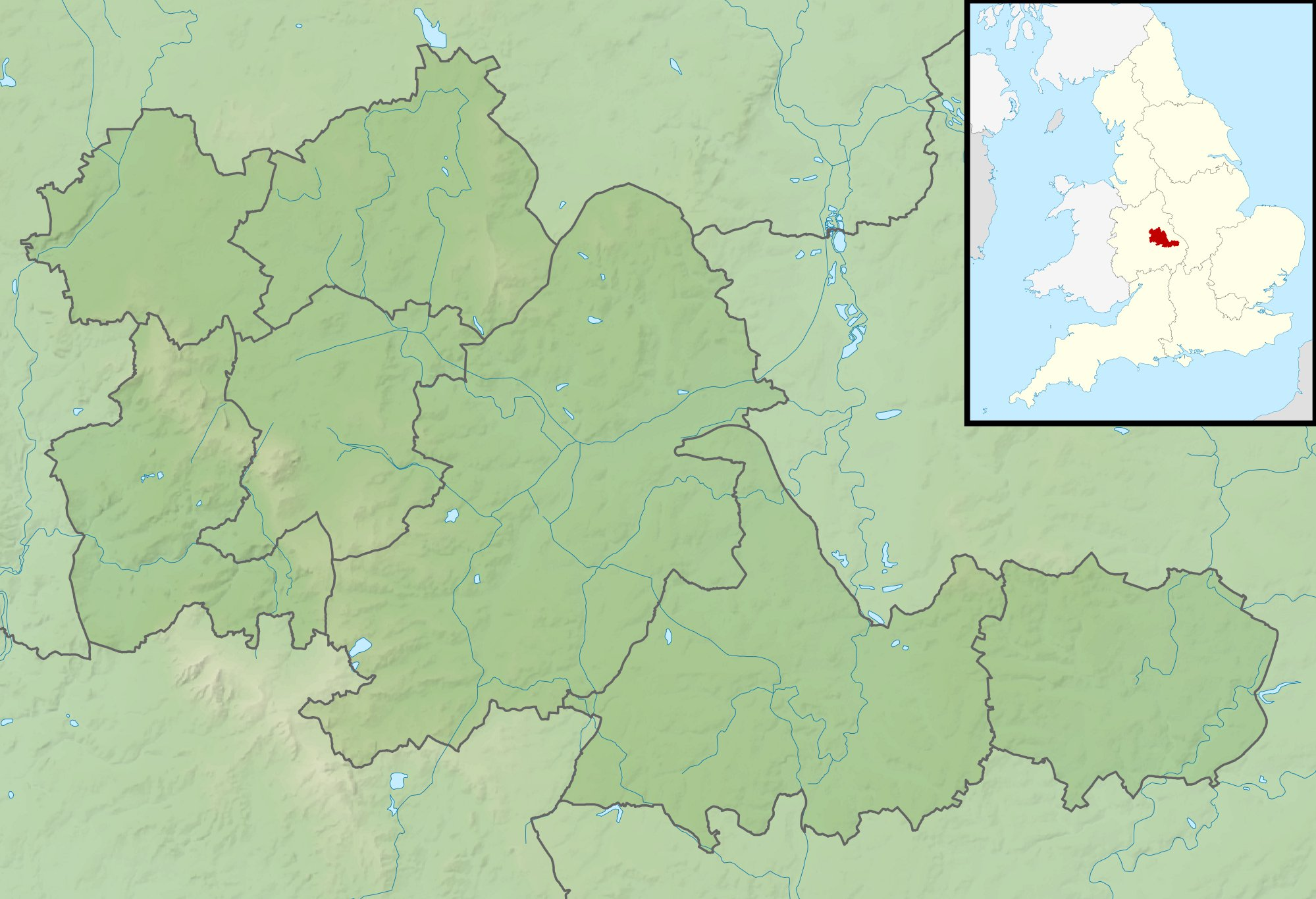
- Location within West Midlands county
- Location: Birmingham
- Coordinates: 52.42788°N 1.99554°W
- Type: Drinking water reservoir
- Primary inflows: Elan Aqueduct
- Primary outflows: Frankley Water Treatment Works
- Catchment area: Elan Valley
- Managing agency: Severn Trent Water
- Built: 1930
- Max. length: 1.05 kilometres (0.65 miles)
- Max. width: 450 metres (1,480 ft)
- Surface area: 0.46 square kilometres (110 acres)
- Average depth: 5.1 metres (17 ft)
- Max. depth: 18 metres (59 ft)
- Water volume: 2.4 million cubic metres (530×10^{6} imp gal)
- Shore length^{1}: 3 km (1.9 miles)
- Surface elevation: 180 metres (590 ft)
- ^{1} Shore length is not a well-defined measure.

Bartley Reservoir is a reservoir for drinking water in Birmingham, England, operated by Severn Trent Water. It covers 460,000 square metres (5,000,000 sq ft).

The reservoir is about 1.05 kilometres (0.65 mi) long, over 450 metres (1,480 ft) wide, and about 18 metres (60 ft) deep at the dam when full. Its surface area is 0.45 square kilometres (0.17 sq mi).

== Ecology ==
The reservoir is known as the place where Bill Oddie did much of his early birdwatching, and features in his books (notably Bill Oddie's Gone Birding) and television programmes. His first ever published article, for the West Midland Bird Club's annual report, was about the birds of the reservoir.

== Leisure ==
The north shore of the reservoir is home to Bartley Sailing Club and Andrew Simpson Centres Birmingham.

== Culture ==
The reservoir featured in a television programme in 1985, when Bill Oddie was interviewed there by Julian Pettifer for a 50-minute Nature Watch Special: Bill Oddie - Bird Watcher.

== See also ==
- Frankley Reservoir
- Frankley Water Treatment Works
