= Perry Barr Reservoir =

Reservoir in Birmingham, England

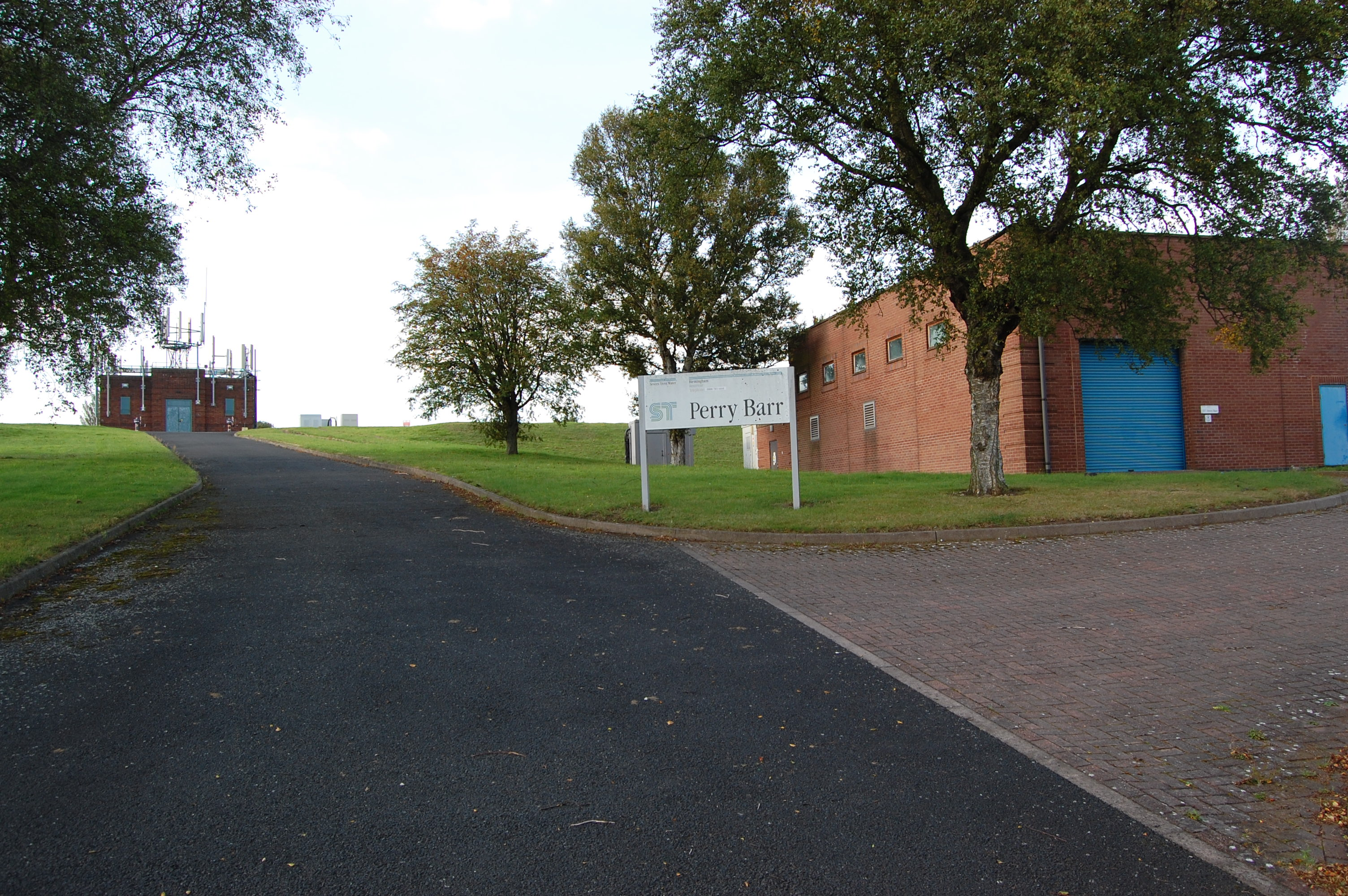
- Buildings at Perry Barr Reservoir

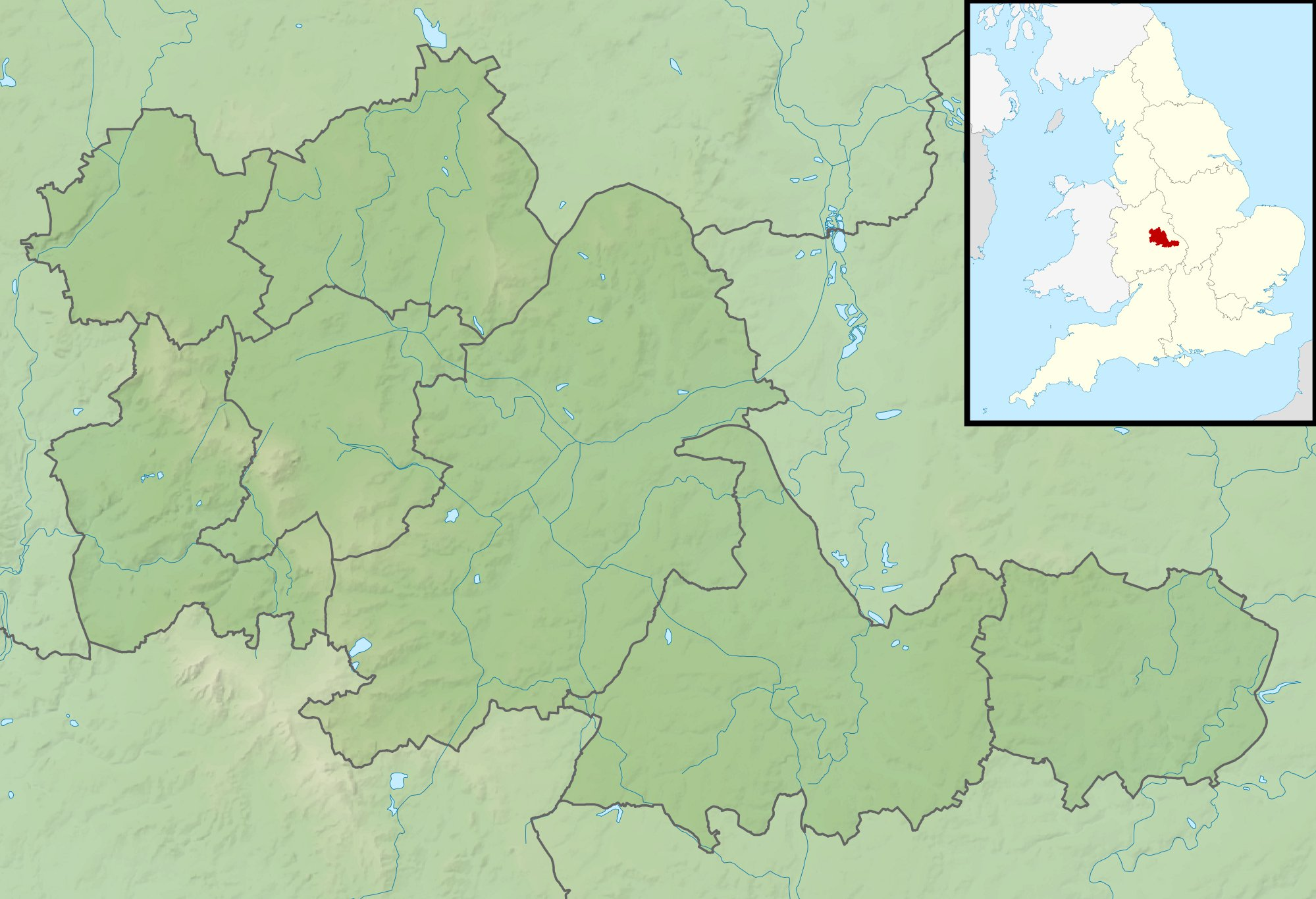
- Location within West Midlands county
- Location: Birmingham
- Coordinates: 52.555846°N 1.878662°W
- Type: reservoir
- Primary inflows: Piped by gravity from Elan Valley
- Basin countries: United Kingdom
- Water volume: 83 million litres (67 acre⋅ft)

Perry Barr Reservoir is a covered drinking water reservoir, in north Birmingham, England, operated by Severn Trent Water. Built for the then Birmingham Corporation Water Department, on the site of the former Perry Barr Farm, it is not, despite its name, in the modern Perry Barr area, but nearby Kingstanding, at grid reference SP083951.

The reservoir is supplied by gravity from The Elan Valley, via Frankley Water Treatment Works and the trunk mains system.

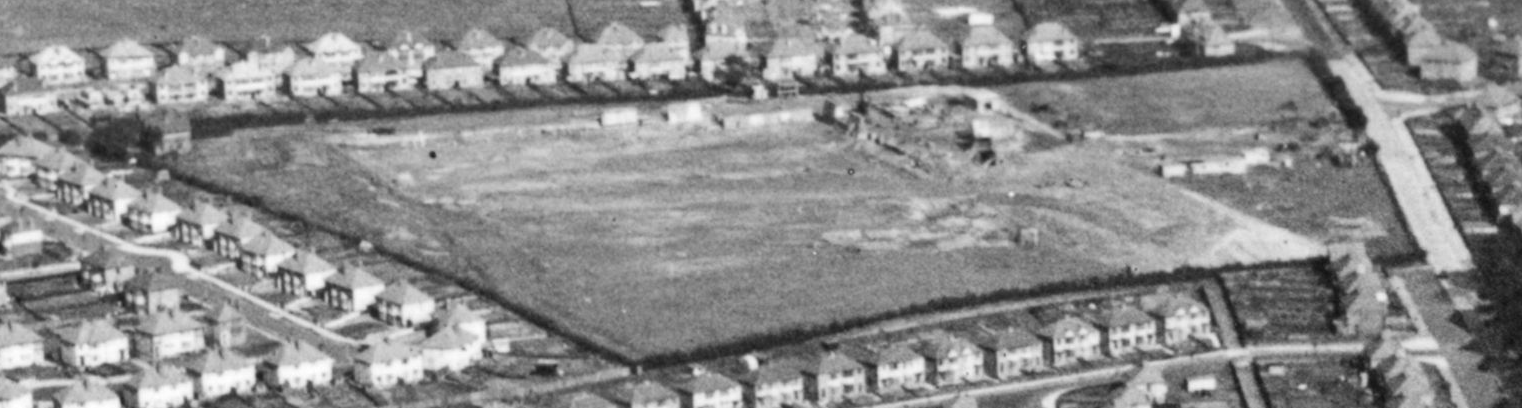
The site of the reservoir, on a 1938 aerial photograph

The reservoir, completed in 1942, has a concrete dam and holds 84 million litres of water. It supplies areas such as Kingstanding, Perry Barr, Great Barr and Witton.

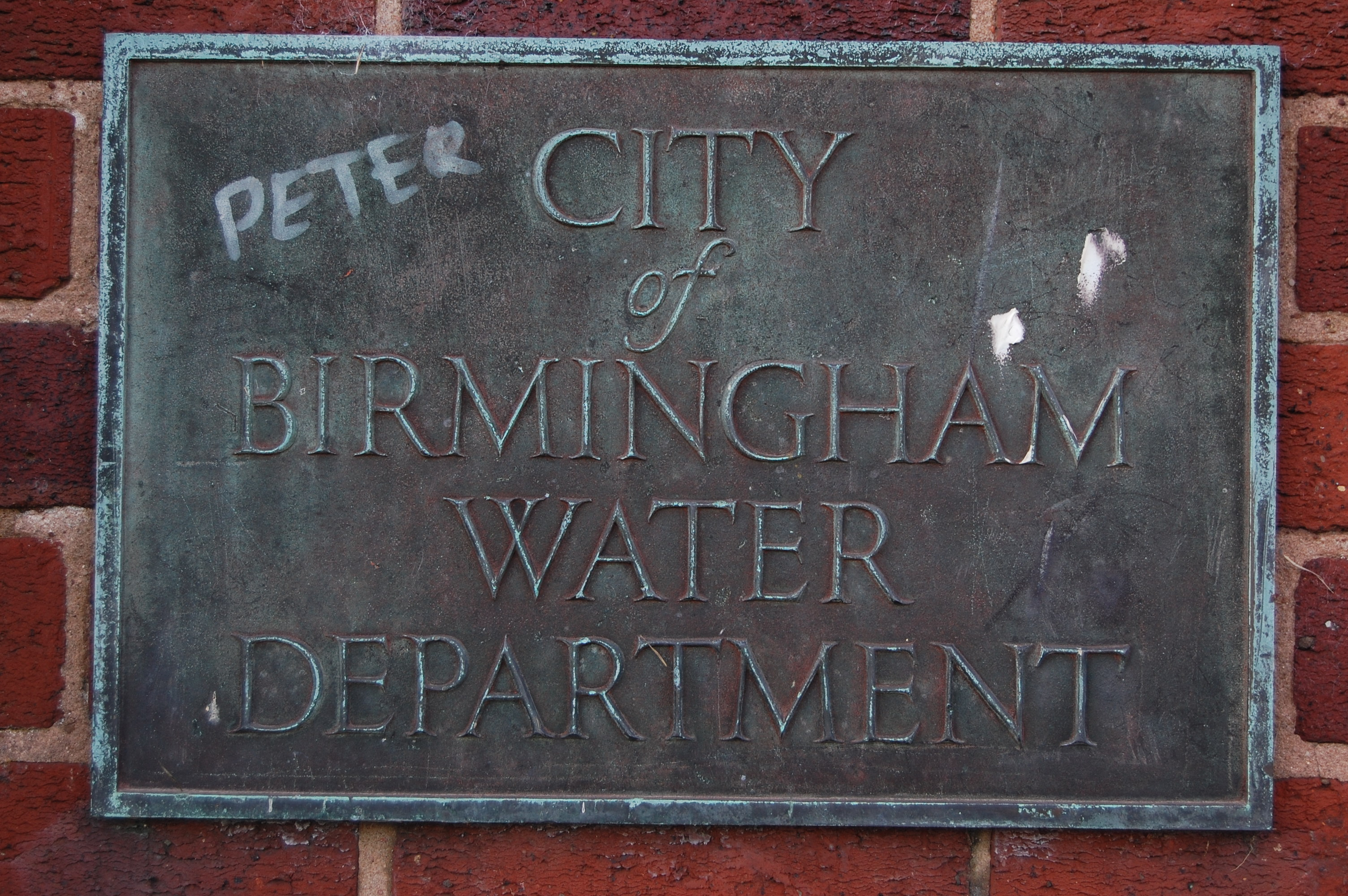
City of Birmingham Water Department sign at Perry Barr Reservoir

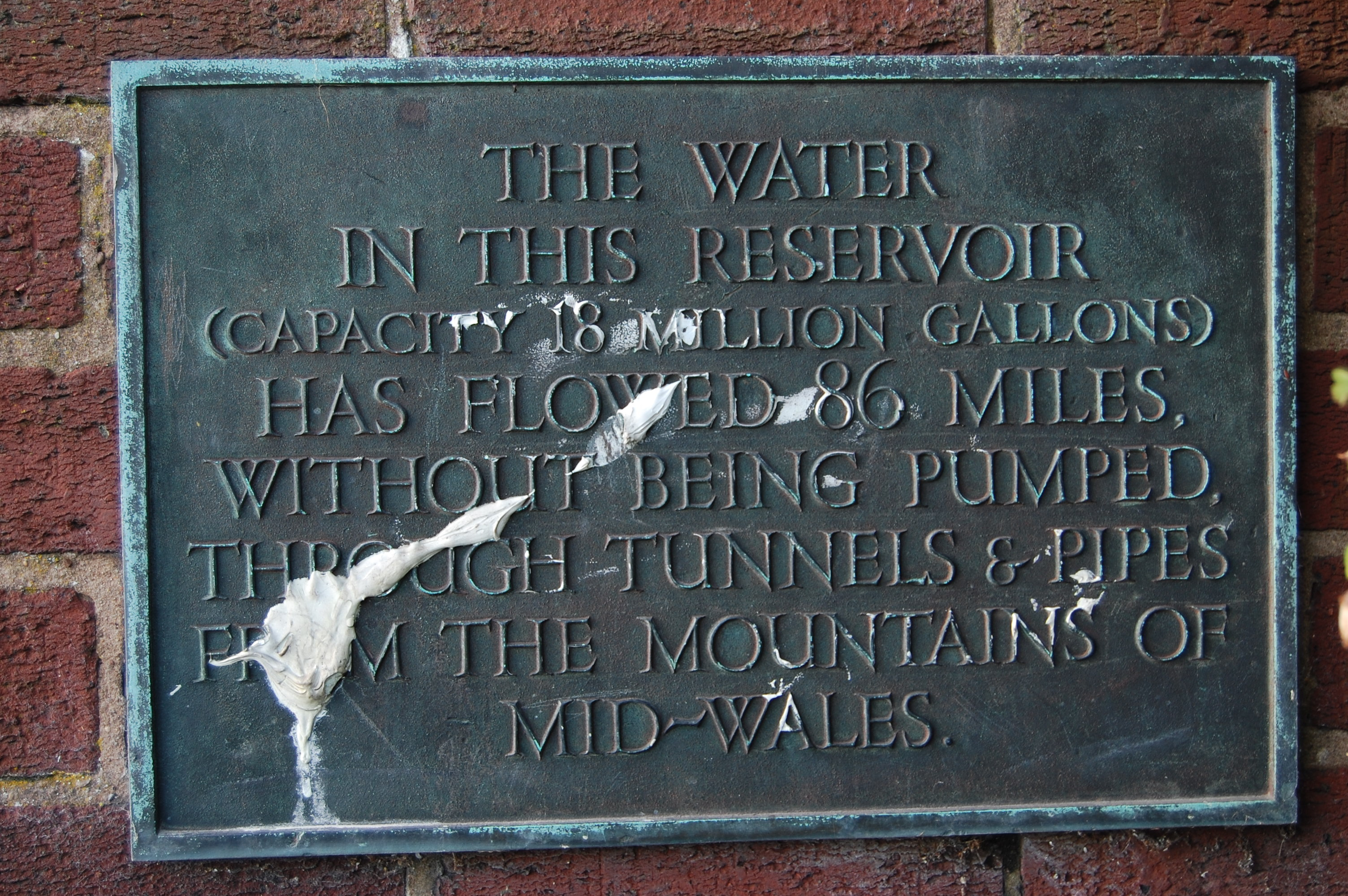
Sign describing Perry Barr Reservoir

There are two old, matching signs at the entrance. One reads:

City of Birmingham Water Department

the other:

The water in this reservoir (capacity 18 million gallons) has flowed 86 miles, without being pumped, though tunnels & pipes from the mountains of mid-Wales.

In August 2013, Severn Trent launched a £2 million project to build a 2.5 miles (4.0 km) pipeline linking the reservoir to South Staffordshire Water's Barr Beacon Reservoir, to allow for the exchange of water in emergencies such as severe droughts.
