= Aston Reservoir =

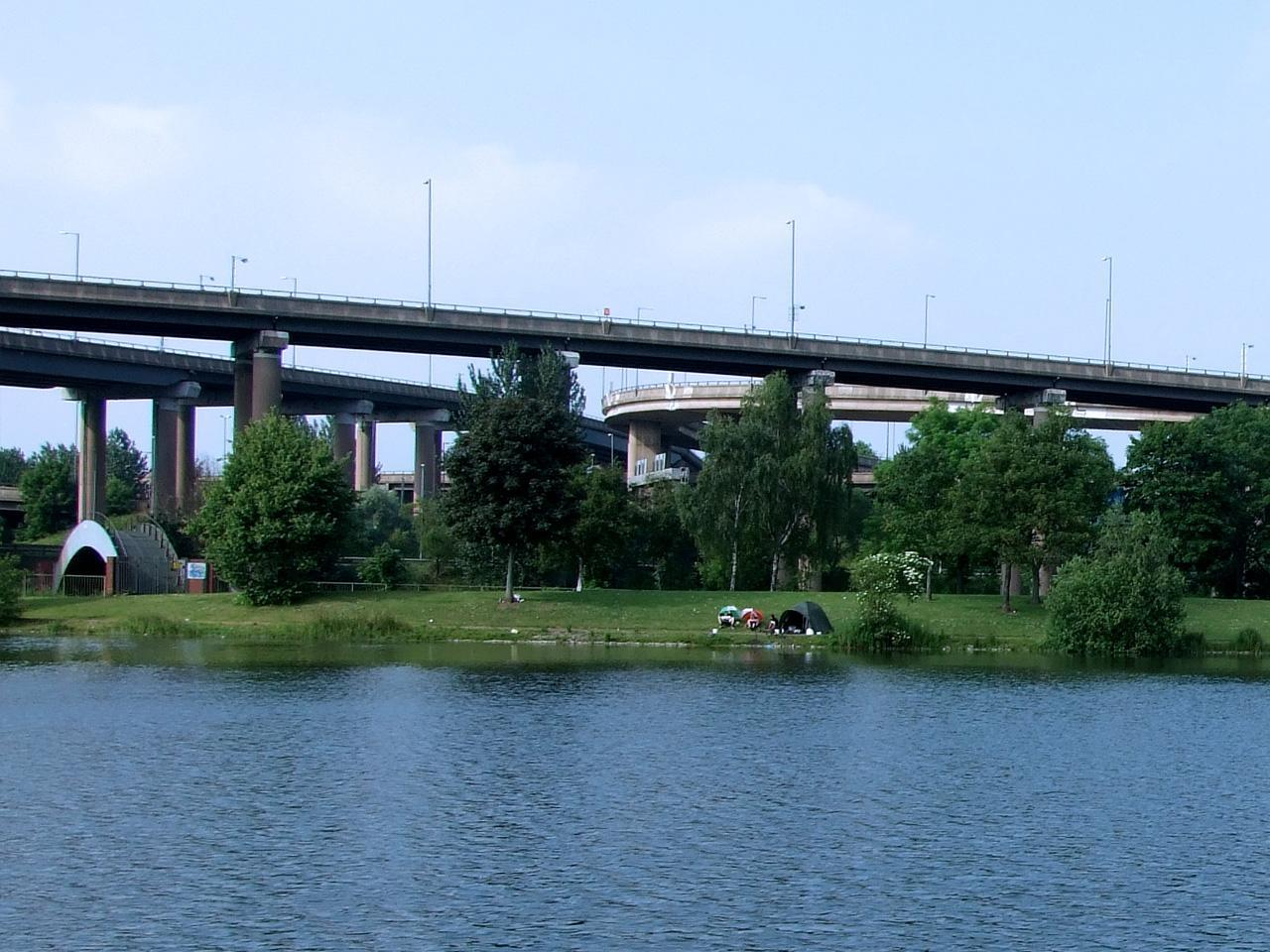
- The north shore of the reservoir, with part of Gravelly Hill Interchange in the background

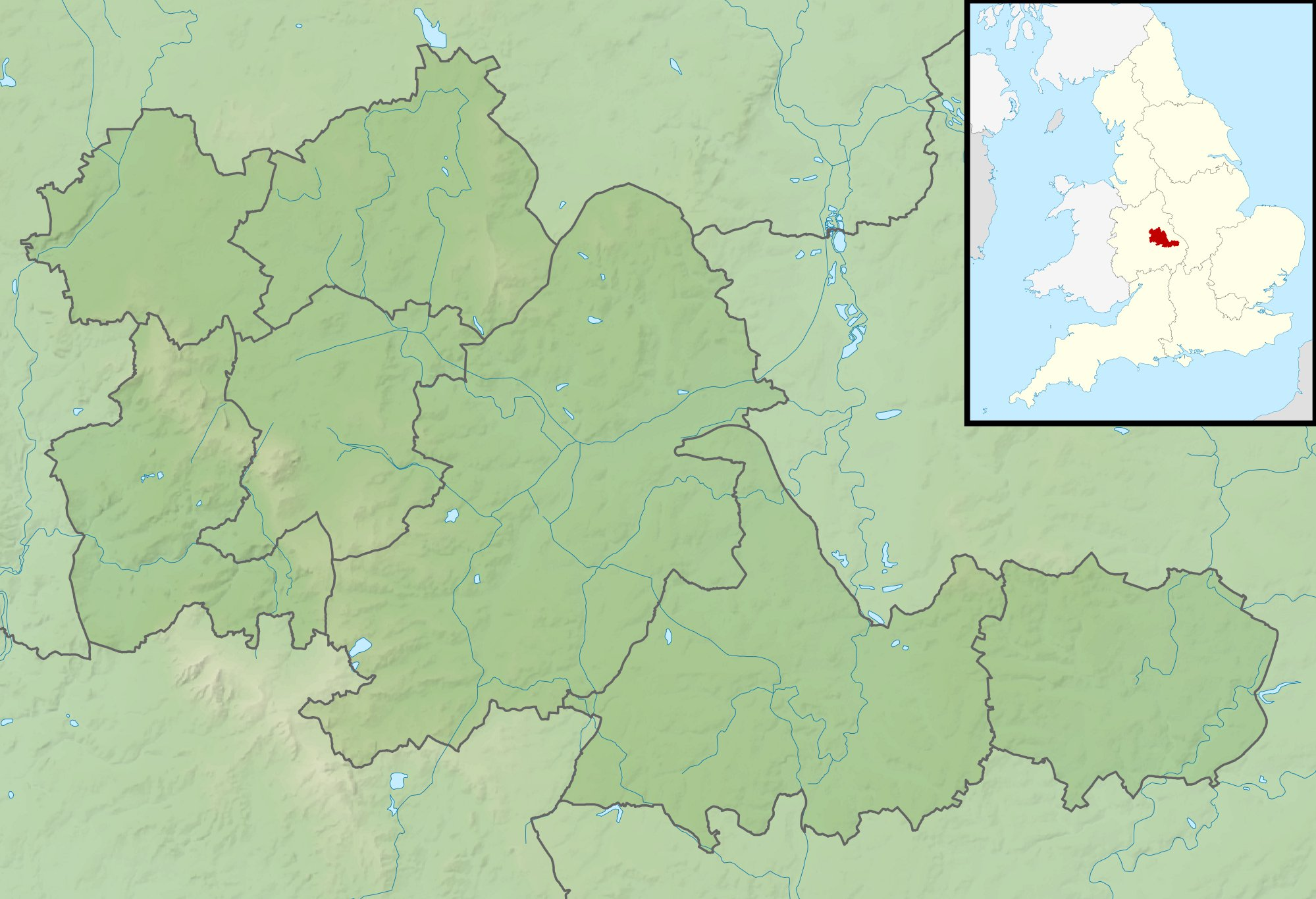
- Location within West Midlands county
- Location: Birmingham
- Coordinates: 52.508797°N 1.867388°W
- Type: Reservoir
- Basin countries: United Kingdom

Aston Reservoir, sometimes known as Salford Lake, Salford Park Pool or Salford Bridge Reservoir, is a 19th-century reservoir, formerly used for drinking water extracted from the River Tame, in Birmingham, England. It was built by the Birmingham Waterworks Company and was at that time situated in the parish of Aston. On 1 January 1876 the company was purchased by Birmingham Corporation Water Department.

It used to be a lake for boating more recently, but that is no longer the case. In the 1950s it was used for speedboat racing. The area around the reservoir is used as a park, Salford Park.

It has a capacity of 111,400 m^{3} (145,700 cu yd) behind an earthfill dam, and sits immediately adjacent to Gravelly Hill Interchange (a.k.a. Spaghetti Junction) of the M6 motorway and Aston Expressway, and in a bend of the river.
