= George Savage (footballer, born 1895) =

English footballer

Personal information
- Full name: George Savage
- Date of birth: 5 December 1895
- Place of birth: Aston, Birmingham, England
- Date of death: 1968 (aged 72–73)
- Position: Left half

Senior career*
Years	Team	Apps	(Gls)
- Willenhall Swifts
1921–1922	West Bromwich Albion	2	(0)
1922–1925	Wrexham	111	(1)
1925–1926	Shrewsbury Town		
1926–1927	Alfreton Town		
1927–1928	Cradley Heath		
- * Club domestic league appearances and goals

George Savage (5 December 1895 – 1968) was an English professional footballer who played as a left half. He made appearances in the English Football League with West Bromwich Albion and Wrexham, the latter of which he made over 100 appearances with. He also played non-league football for Willenhall Swifts, Shrewsbury Town, Alfreton Town and Cradley Heath.
