= Frankley =

Village in Worcestershire, England

Coordinates: 52°25′20″N 2°00′45″W

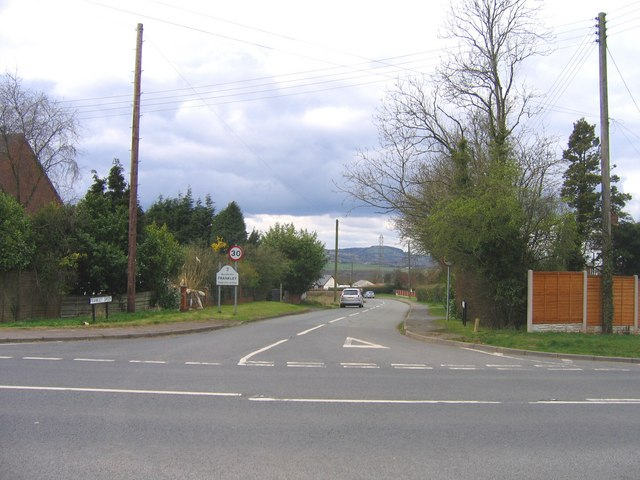
A Crossroads in Frankley

Frankley is a village and civil parish in Worcestershire. The modern Frankley estate is part of the New Frankley civil parish in Birmingham, and has been part of the city since 1995. The parish has a population of 122.

== History ==
The name Frankley derives from the Old English Francalēah meaning 'Franca's wood/clearing'.

Frankley is listed within the hundred of Cane in Worcestershire in the 1086 Domesday Survey. In the mid-12th century Cane was combined with other Domesday hundreds to form the hundred of Halfshire, which was extant through the 19th century. Adam de Harvington, or de Herwynton, (died c.1345), Lord Treasurer of Ireland, owned the manor of Frankley in the fourteenth century.

== St Leonards Church ==
The 15th-century church building lies to the north of the village. The building is constructed from sandstone in a red and grey colour, until 1965 the tower contained two bells. A new church hall was constructed in 2005.

== Frankley services ==
The village gives its name to Frankley services, a motorway service area on the M5 motorway to the north west of the village. The services opened with the motorway in 1966.

== See also ==
- Frankley Reservoir
- Frankley Water Treatment Works
