= Barr Beacon Reservoir =

Covered drinking water reservoir in Walsall, England

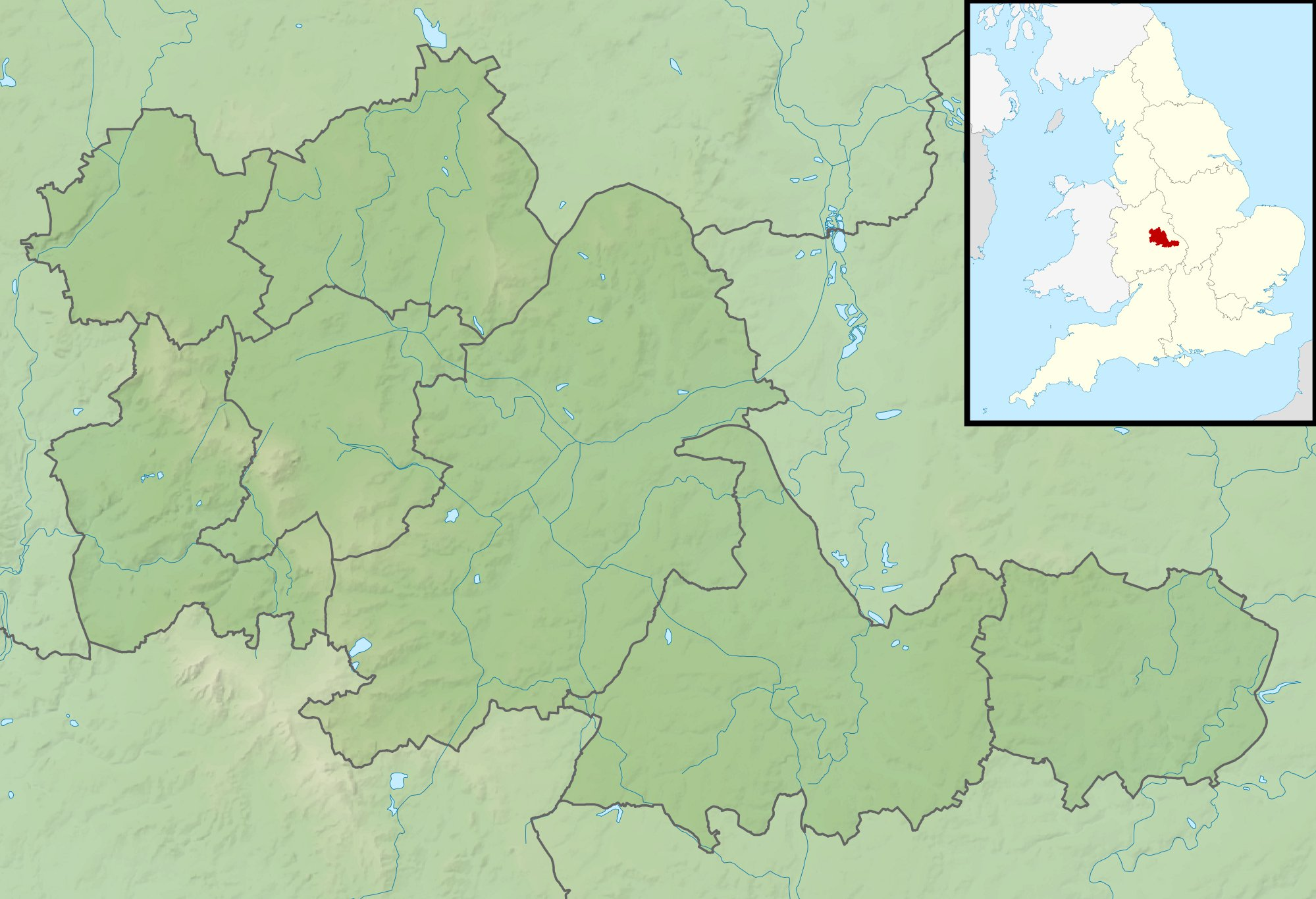
- Location within West Midlands county
- Location: Barr Beacon, Walsall
- Coordinates: 52.5756°N 1.91152°W
- Type: Covered
- Basin countries: England
- Managing agency: South Staffs Water
- First flooded: 1899

Barr Beacon Reservoir is a covered, hill-top drinking water reservoir at Barr Beacon, Walsall, England, opened in 1899. It is operated by South Staffs Water.

One of the uses of the reservoir is to transfer water from the company's works at Hampton Loade, on the River Severn, to Burton upon Trent. Water is pumped uphill from the Sedgley Beacon Reservoirs, which receive water from Hampton Loade, through 45-inch (110 cm) mains to Barr Beacon Reservoir via West Bromwich Booster. A 36-inch (91 cm) main then carries water by gravity via Seedy Mill works to Burton on Trent.

The water company also operates a weather station, one of several in its network, at the reservoir, to monitor temperature, hours of sunshine, and rainfall.

The reservoir was re-roofed in 1969, temporarily exposing the brick arches which support the roof.

In August 2013, Severn Trent Water launched a £2 million project to build a 2½-mile pipeline linking their Perry Barr Reservoir to Barr Beacon Reservoir, to allow for the exchange of water in emergencies such as severe droughts.

== 2011 flooding incident ==
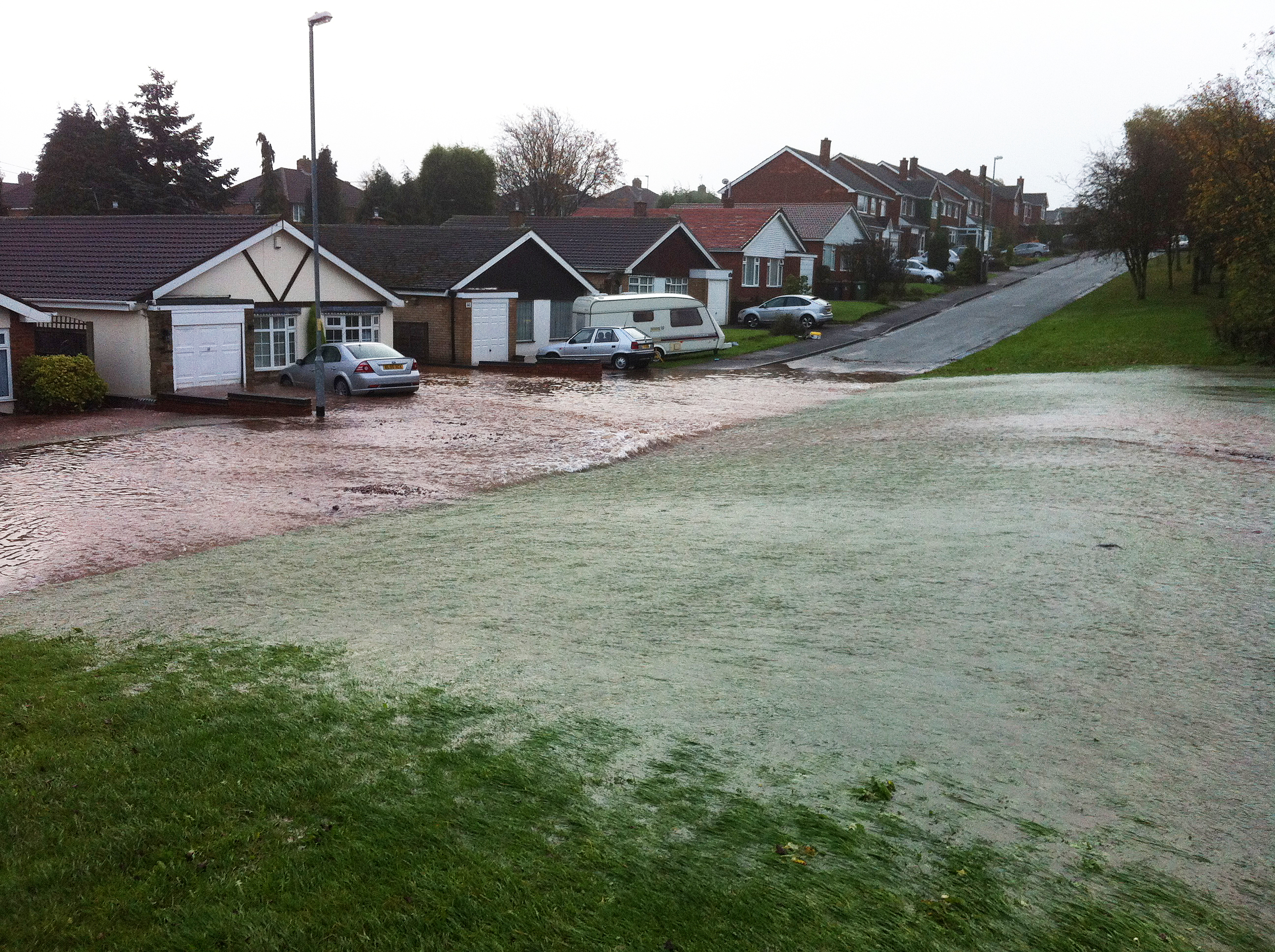
More than two hours after the burst

Shortly after 5am on 12 November 2011, the 36-inch water main north of the reservoir burst, emptying the reservoir of around 2,000,000 litres (440,000 imp gal) of water, and flooding up to 150 homes in Aldridge Road, and Elm Tree Road in the Blackwood estate in the Streetly area of Sutton Coldfield.

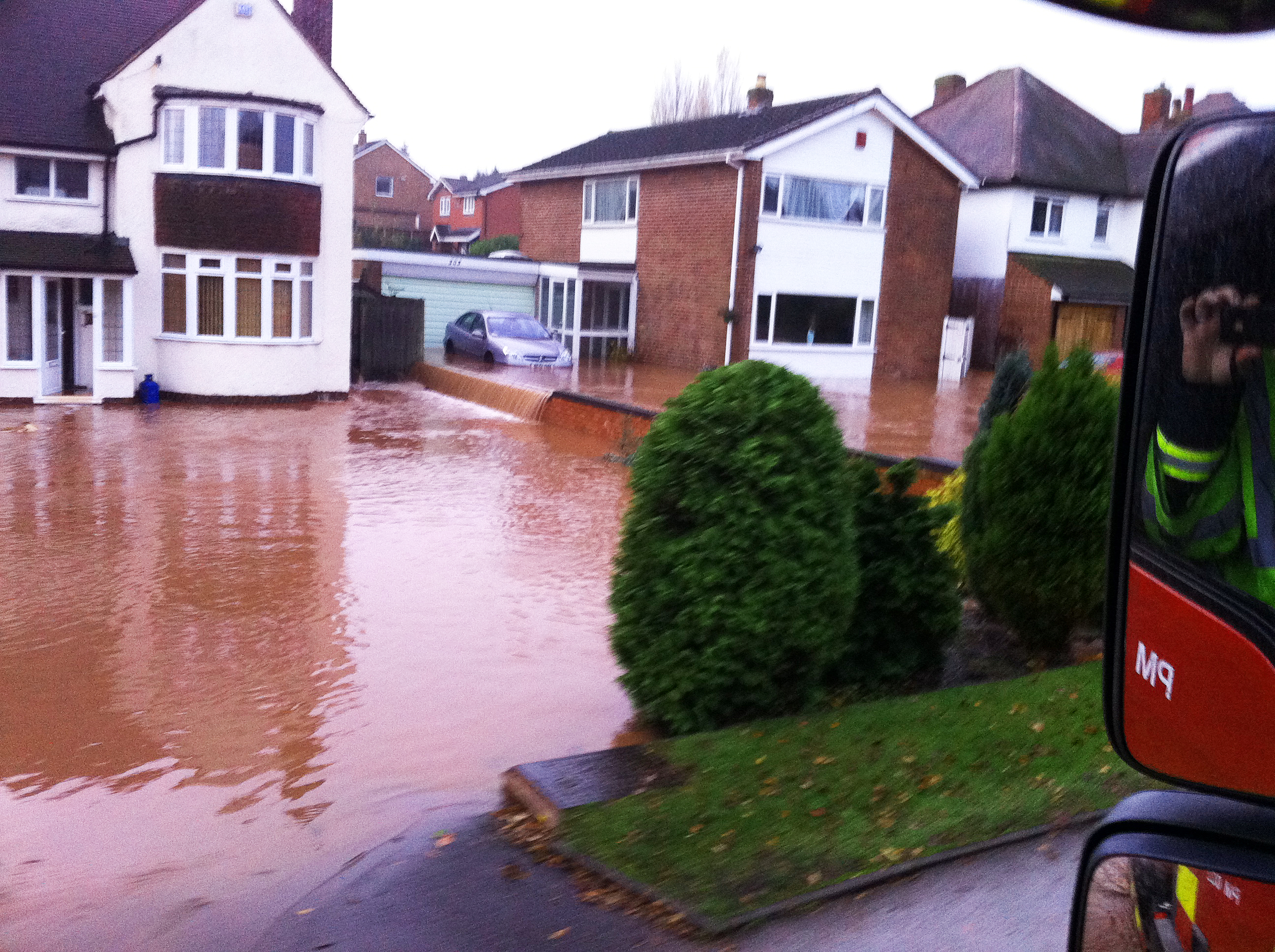
More than two hours after the burst

Dozens of families had to be evacuated. Eleven fire trucks, from stations as far away as Erdington, and a high-volume pump from Sheldon, attended. A fire service boat was also deployed. The West Midlands Police, police helicopter, ambulance service and a specialist Automobile Association vehicle recovery unit also attended. Waters did not subside until 8am. The cause of the burst was not known, but South Staffs Water estimated that the floods caused more than a £1 million of damage.
