= James Mansergh =

English civil engineer

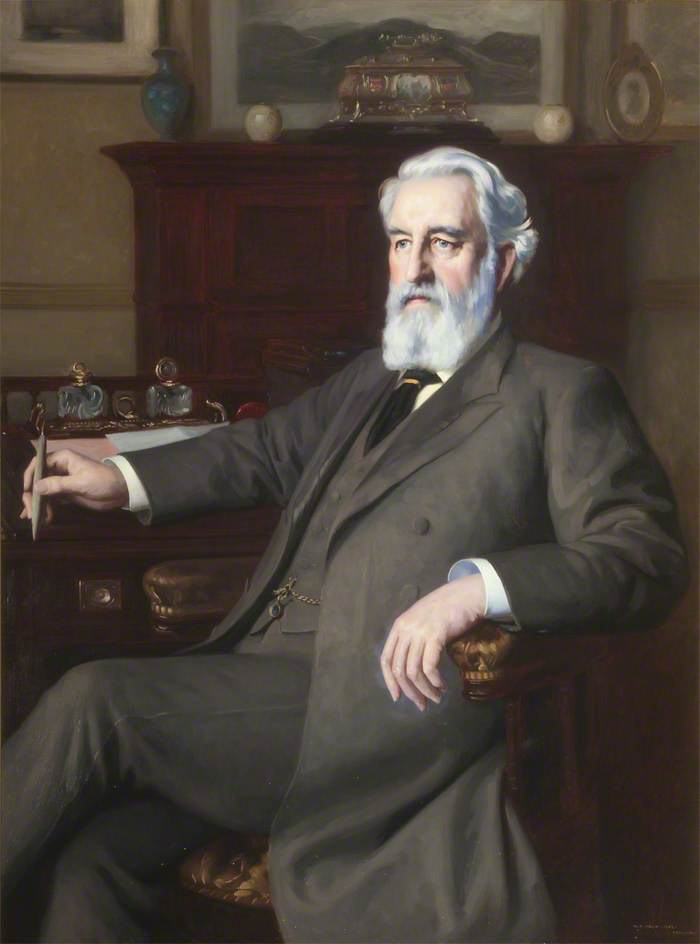
- Born: 29 April 1834; Lancaster, Lancashire
- Died: 15 June 1905 (aged 71); Hampstead, London, England
- Resting place: Hampstead Cemetery
- Engineering career
- Discipline: Civil
- Institutions: Institution of Civil Engineers (president); Engineering Standards Committee (chairman)
- Projects: Claymills Pumping Station, Hury Reservoir, Elan Reservoirs/Elan Aqueduct

James Mansergh FRS (29 April 1834 – 15 June 1905) was an English civil engineer.

Mansergh was born in Lancaster. He started his career in railway work and then designed many sewerage schemes and fresh water schemes.

His most famous projects were:

- Elan Valley Dam and Elan aqueduct for Birmingham Corporation Water Department, England (water supply).
- Hury Reservoir for Stockton and Middlesbrough, England (water supply).
- Abbeystead Dam, one of the first stone-faced concrete dams.
- Werribee sewage works and farm for Melbourne, Australia.
- Claymills Pumping Station for Burton upon Trent, England (sewage disposal).
- Laid out parts of Ramsey, Isle of Man (drainage).

== Biography ==
He became a member of the council of the Institution of Civil Engineers in 1884, vice-president in 1895 and was elected to the chair of the institution from November 1900 to November 1901.

He became the elected chairman of the Engineering Standards Committee, when it was formed in 1901 from a combination of organizations, which later became the British Standards Institution. He served as High Sheriff of Radnorshire for 1901.

He was elected a Fellow of the Royal Society in 1901. His candidature citation read:

President of the Institution of Civil Engineers. Author of 'Lectures on Water Supply, Prospecting for Water, Prospecting and Boring' delivered at the School of Military Engineering, Chatham, also of 'The Supply of Water to Towns,' and other works. The designer of the waterworks and sewerage of Lancaster, Lincoln, Stockton, Middlesbrough, Rotherham, Southport, Burton-on-Trent, Melbourne (Australia), Birmingham, and many other towns. These designs include some of the largest schemes of water supply, sewerage or sewage disposal for Halifax, Hereford, St Helens, Darlington, Whitby, the Potteries, Derby, Southampton, Durham, Shrewsbury, Malvern, Cambridge, Edinburgh, Plymouth, York, Antigua, Philadelphia (US), and other places. Was a member of the Royal Commission on Metropolitan Water Supply. Eminent as a hydraulic engineer.

In March 1903 he received the honorary freedom of his native town of Lancaster.

He died at 51 Fitzjohns Avenue, Hampstead, London, and was buried in Hampstead Cemetery.

Professional and academic associations
Preceded by Douglas Fox	President of the Institution of Civil Engineers; November 1900 – November 1901	Succeeded by Charles Hawksley
