= Elan aqueduct =

Water connection between Powys and Birmingham

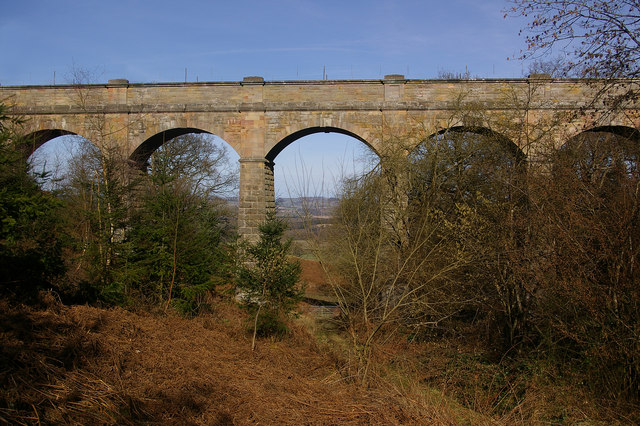
Elan aqueduct on the Deepwood Dingle Crossing, Bringewood

The Elan aqueduct crosses Wales and the Midlands of England, running eastwards from the Elan Valley Reservoirs in Mid Wales to Birmingham's Frankley Reservoir, carrying drinking water for Birmingham.

It delivers enormous quantities of water across the mid-Wales countryside, through north Herefordshire, south Shropshire and into the West Midlands through eleven major river valleys. The aqueduct is 73 miles (117 km) long, down which the water travels at less than two miles per hour (3 km/h), taking one and a half days to get to Birmingham.

== Construction ==
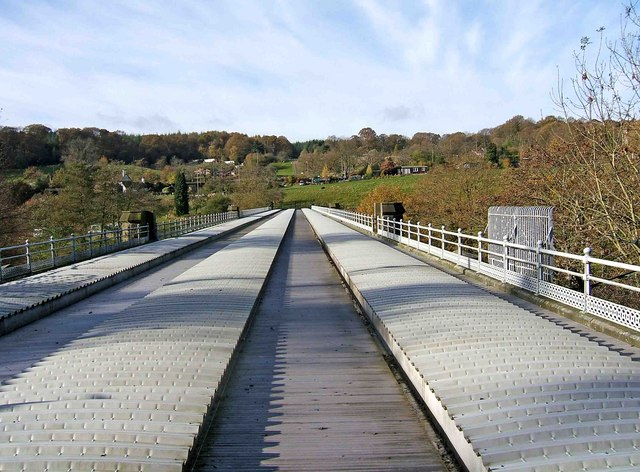
View over the aqueduct as it crosses the River Severn

Work on the first 13 miles (21 km) of the route from the Elan Valley was started in June 1896 by Birmingham Corporation Water Department. The aqueduct was built in sections by outside contractors, using three types of construction depending on the nature of the terrain it had to cross. "Cut and cover" was essentially a brick lined channel which was manually dug as a trench, then roofed over and concealed underground. Where the route of the aqueduct encountered high ground above the gradient needed to maintain the downward slope, a certain amount of tunnelling was required; at one point the tunnel is 100 metres below ground, ensuring the aqueduct was at only 220 metres above sea level. This totalled around 12 miles (19 km), with the longest single length being just over 4 miles (6.4 km). The third construction type was the use of either bridged aqueducts or inverted syphons to cross valleys and rivers where the ground level dropped too steeply for the required hydraulic gradient to be maintained. The pipeline was continued at the other side of the valley at the same height as the delivery pipe. With the inverted syphon technique, the water naturally fills the lower section of pipe due to the head of water and flow continues downstream.

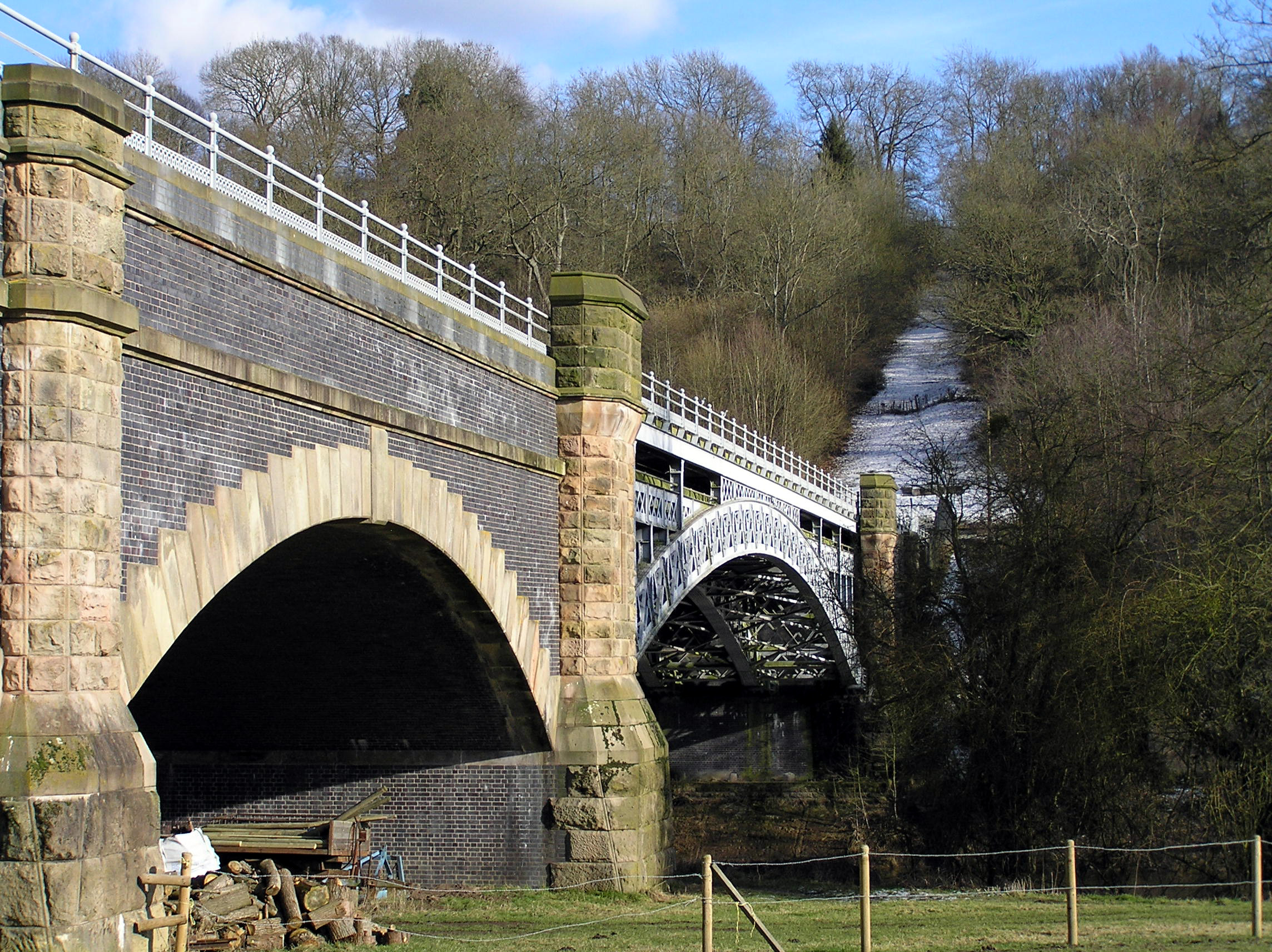
The aqueduct over the River Severn

The initial scheme opened in 1906 with two 42 in-diameter (1,100 mm) pipes. Two more pipes of 63 in (1,600 mm) diameter were added between 1919 and 1961.

As part of the Birmingham Resilience Project, between 2017 and 2020, three sections of the aqueduct route were bypassed with new tunnels. These were at the 1.8km Bleddfa diversion, the 1km Natmel diversion and the 1.8km Frydd Wood diversion.

== Engineer ==
The engineer for the Elan aqueduct scheme was James Mansergh.

== Route ==
The route is Caban Coch (52.264032°N 3.597665°W) via Elan Valley, Rhayader, Dolau, Knighton, Leintwardine, Downton on the Rock, Ludlow, Knowbury, Cleobury Mortimer, Bewdley and Hagley to Frankley (52.422451°N 2.001329°W).

Interactive Map of Elan Aqueduct

=== Features ===
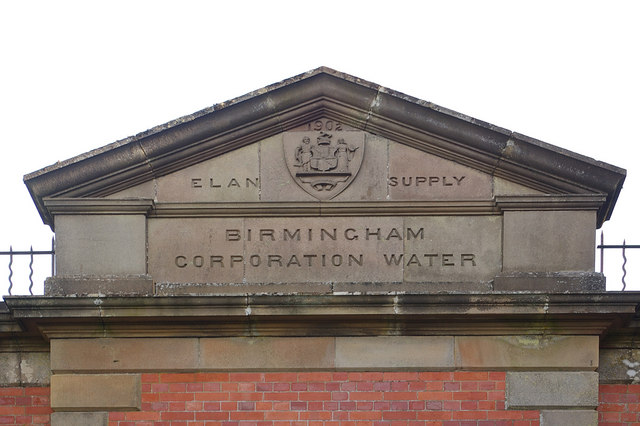
Pediment of valve house with "Birmingham Corporation Water" wording

The aqueduct and its related features are visible at:

- River Wye: 52.296442°N 3.503467°W
- Valve house: 52.291594°N 3.444634°W
- Nantmel Aqueduct: 52.286113°N 3.416445°W
- Carmel Aqueduct: 52.287612°N 3.383281°W
- Bridge over culverted stream: 52.300834°N 3.216593°W
- Observation tower: 52.303591°N 3.188647°W
- Bridge over stream: 52.314798°N 3.121883°W
- Survey tower: 52.320521°N 3.107452°W
- Brynymor: 52.287640°N 3.383070°W
- Hidden Aqueduct: 52.334666°N 3.068550°W
- Valve house: 52.339871°N 3.045829°W
- Inspection chamber: 52.347854°N 3.004957°W
- Inspection chamber: 52.348547°N 2.980469°W
- Graham's Cottage Bridge (River Teme, Leintwardine): 52.347344°N 2.858526°W
- Downton Bridge (River Teme, Downton): 52.350831°N 2.840863°W
- Inspection chamber: 52.354799°N 2.825199°W
- Valve house: 52.359273°N 2.803600°W
- Inspection chamber: 52.360114°N 2.796648°W
- Valve house: 52.360438°N 2.793830°W
- Deepwood Dingle crossing ("80 or 90 feet high", built by Morrison & Mason of Glasgow): 52.360697°N 2.789672°W
- Wheelers Vallets Dingle Crossing: 52.361508°N 2.780470°W
- Teme Bridge (River Teme, Ludlow): 52.359678°N 2.703721°W
- Ledwyche Brook: 52.3603172°N 2.6802536°W
- Inspection chamber: 52.363091°N 2.628587°W
- Bennett's End Bridge (Cumberley Lane/ Colly Brook): 52.365627°N 2.617254°W
- Hope Bagot Bridge: 52.364581°N 2.605730°W
- Corn Brook: 52.369394°N 2.581770°W
- Trig point: 52.366449°N 2.596530°W
- Valve house: 52.381486°N 2.507248°W
- Bridge over stream: 52.385448°N 2.492773°W
- River Rea: 52.387401°N 2.478847°W
- Mad Brook: 52.393083°N 2.413848°W
- River Severn: 52.40117°N 2.33145°W
- Siphon: 52.414734°N 2.266107°W
- Siphon: 52.416608°N 2.252064°W
- Siphon: 52.429898°N 2.163124°W
- Siphon: 52.429569°N 2.152842°W
- Remains of former bridge over Birmingham-Worcester railway line: 52.429318°N 2.142821°W

Some crossings over canals and railways have been replaced by buried pipes. The line of the buried aqueduct through woodland is marked by a 20-metre (66 ft) "exclusion zone" from which trees are removed.

== See also ==
- List of crossings of the River Severn
