= Frankley Water Treatment Works =

Drinking water plant in Birmingham, England

Coordinates: 52°25′11.44″N 1°59′32.92″W

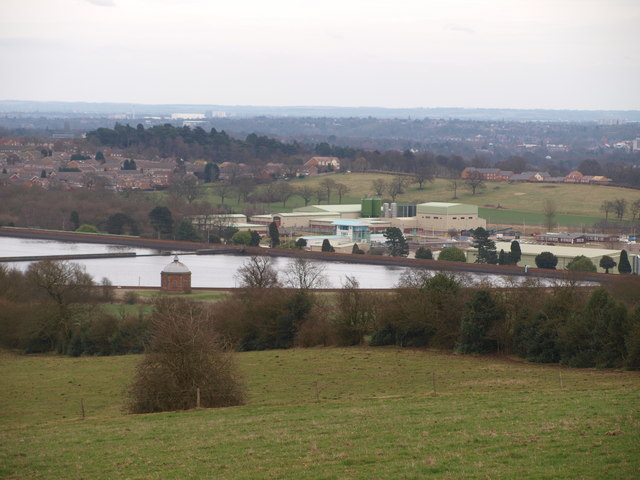
Frankley Reservoir and Water Treatment Works

Frankley Water Treatment Works is a drinking water plant at Frankley, Birmingham, England. Owned by Severn Trent Water, it supplies drinking water to Birmingham and the surrounding area. The plant treats water from the Elan Valley in Wales, which arrives at Frankley Reservoir by gravity feed along the Elan aqueduct with a gradient of 1 in 2,300.
