= Frankley Reservoir =

Lake in Worcestershire, England

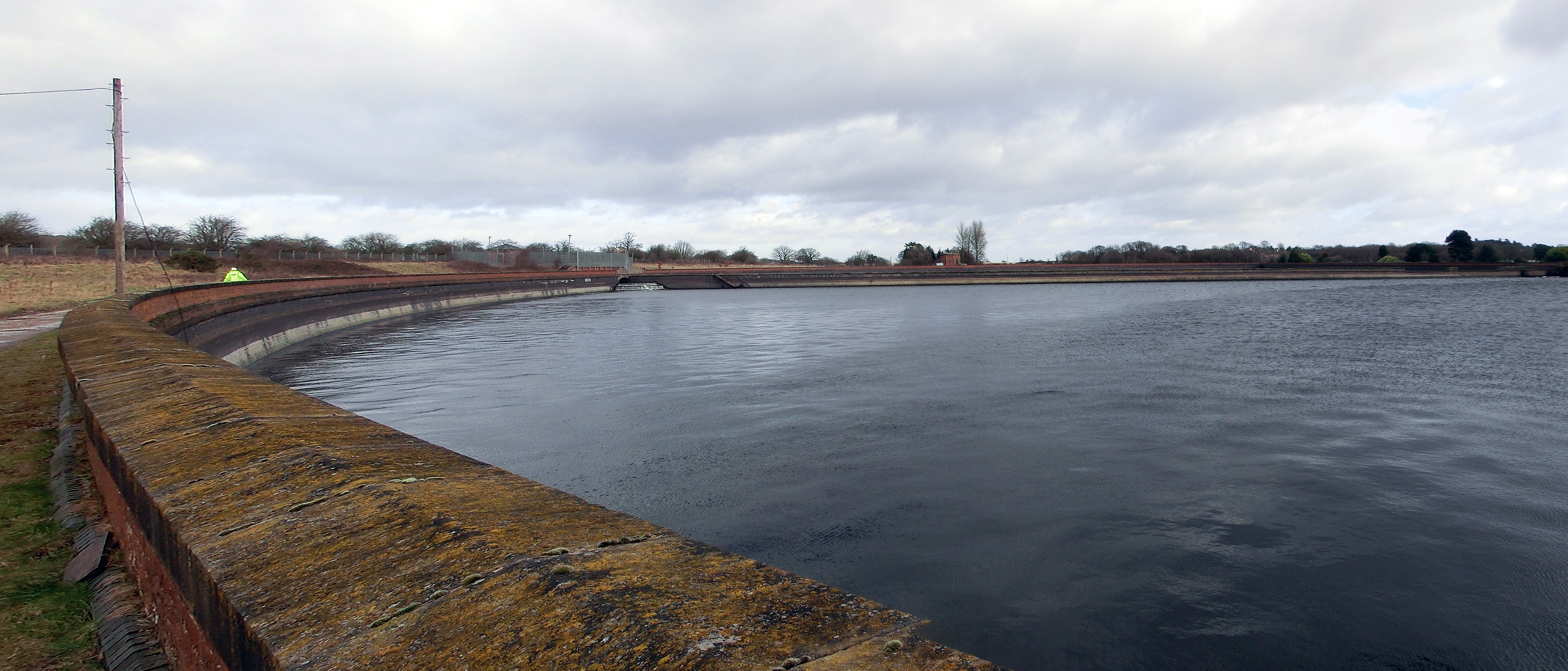

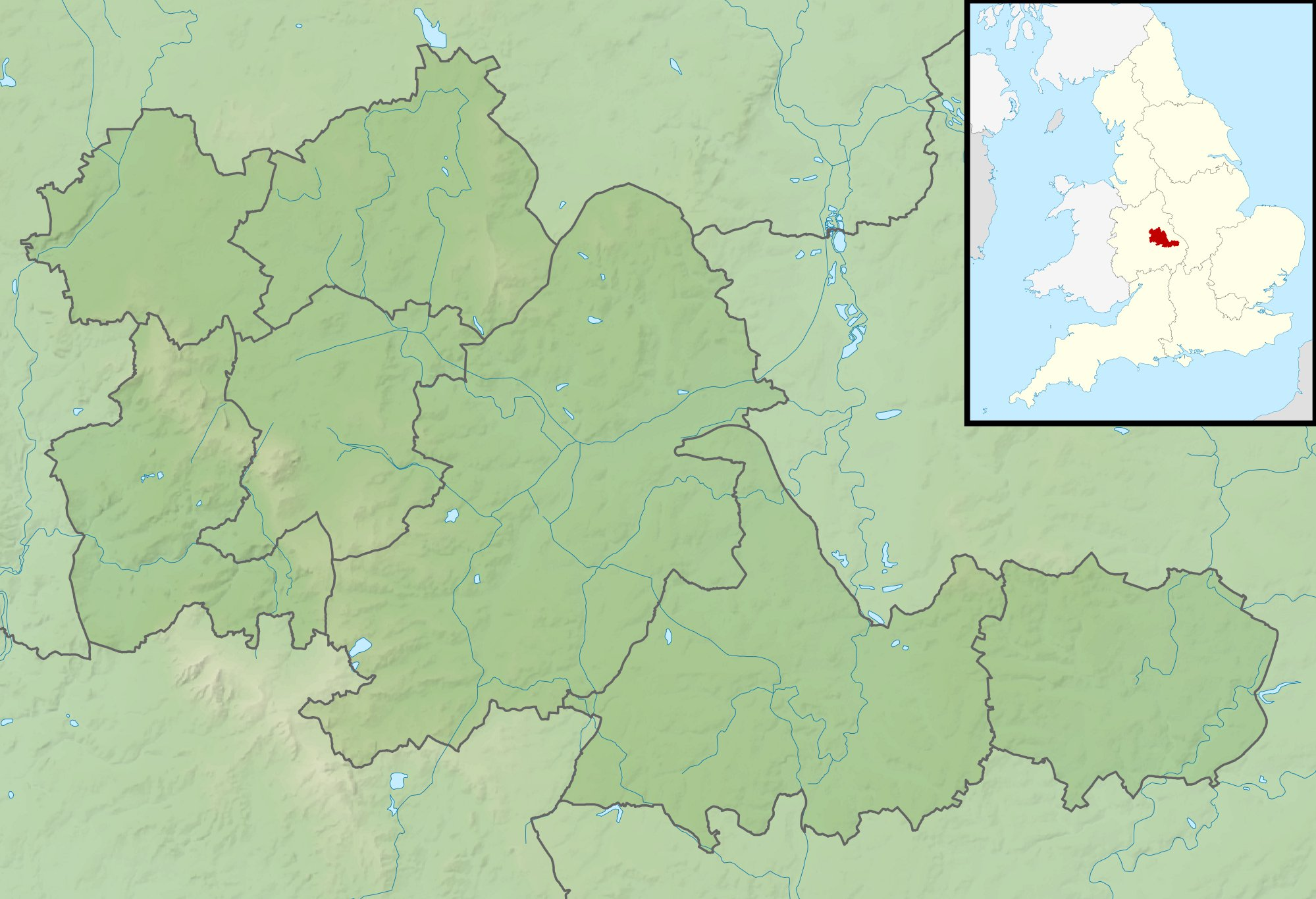
- Location within West Midlands county
- Location: Birmingham
- Coordinates: 52.42069°N 1.99849°W
- Type: Drinking water
- Primary inflows: Elan aqueduct
- Primary outflows: Frankley Water Treatment Works

Birmingham Corporation Water Act 1892
- Act of Parliament
- Parliament of the United Kingdom
- Long title: An Act for empowering the corporation of the city of Birmingham to obtain a supply of water from the rivers Elan and Claerwen and for other purposes.
- Citation: 55 & 56 Vict. c. clxxiii

Dates
- Royal assent: 27 June 1892

Frankley Reservoir is a semi-circular reservoir for drinking water in Birmingham, England, operated by Severn Trent Water. Its construction was authorised by the Birmingham Corporation Water Act 1892 (55 & 56 Vict. c. clxxiii) It was built by Birmingham Corporation Water Department to designs by Abram Kellett of Ealing in 1904.

It contains 900,000 cubic metres (200,000,000 imp gal) of water received from the Elan Valley Reservoirs, 117 km (73 mi) away, in Wales, which arrives via the Elan aqueduct, by the power of gravity alone, dropping 52 metres (171 ft) – an average gradient of 1 in 2,300.

Before 1987 it was leaking 540 litres (120 imp gal) per second. In that year ground-penetrating radar was used successfully to isolate the leaks.

== See also ==
- List of reservoirs and dams in the United Kingdom
- Frankley Water Treatment Works
