= St Andrew's Church, Fulham =

Coordinates: 51.4870°N 0.2087°W

St Andrew's Church, Fulham Fields
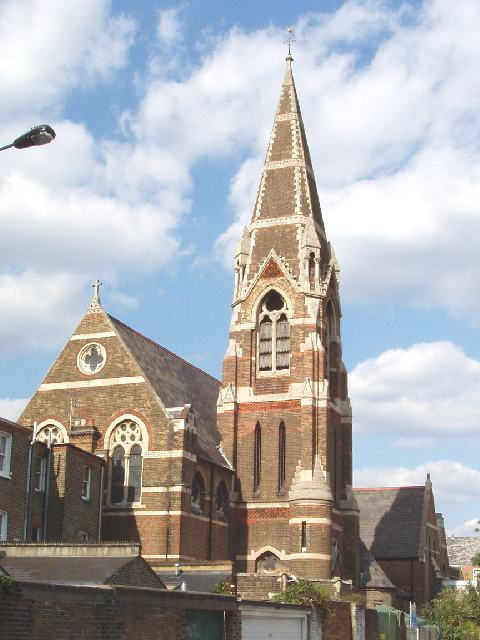
- St Andrew's Church, Fulham Fields
- OS grid reference: TQ 24468 77970
- Location: Greyhound Road, Fulham, London, W14 9SA
- Country: England
- Denomination: Church of England
- Churchmanship: Liberal-catholic
- Website: Official website

History
- Dedication: Andrew the Apostle
- Consecrated: 25 July 1874

Administration
- Province: Canterbury
- Diocese: London
- Archdeaconry: Middlesex
- Deanery: Hammersmith and Fulham

Listed Building – Grade II
- Designated: 9 February 2009
- Reference no.: 1393119

St. Andrew's Church, Fulham, also known as St. Andrew's Church, West Kensington, is a Church of England church located in West Kensington, near Fulham in southwest London. The church was founded in 1873. The church is notable for the fact that some of its parishioners were responsible for establishing Fulham Football Club. It has been Grade II listed since 2009.

== History ==
The foundation stone of St. Andrew's was laid on 14 June 1873 by John Jackson, Bishop of London. The church was designed by Newman and Billing, and the architectural style was 13th-century French Gothic. The church was officially consecrated on 25 July 1874, and on 30 November an Order in Council was made by Queen Victoria which gave St. Andrew's its own parish, carved out of areas previously in the parishes of All Saints and St John's in Fulham, and St Mary's in West Kensington.

The pioneer Channel swimmer, Captain Matthew Webb and his wife Madeleine Kate Chaddock were married at the church on 27 April 1880.

In 1893 the parish hall was completed. In 1894 it was discovered that St. Andrew's was becoming too small to support its congregation, and so the vicar decided to have the church enlarged slightly. Aston Webb and Ingress Bell designed new vestries to the west of the tower, and a new baptistry adjacent to the south aisle. The organ was moved to a new loft.

In 1973 the Victorian church hall was sold and demolished, and a new hall installed at the west end of the church. This was further altered in 2011 when it was turned into a four-storey community centre, separated from the main part of the church by a glass screen. At the same time, the church building was given a new floor and baptismal font and the pews were replaced by chairs.

== Architecture ==
The church is built in the Gothic Revival style of yellow stock brick banded with red brick and Box stone dressings. It includes a distinctive tower and spire at the west end, a nave with round thick-traceried windows in the low clerestory, lean-to aisles, north and south transepts, and separate, lower chancel, and a semicircular baptistery, added by Webb and Bell, with a conical roof and single foiled lights in flush stone surrounds.

The church was given the bell of the former St Martin Outwich in the City of London, said to be the only church bell to have survived the Great Fire of London, and still in use today.

Inside the church, the rood screen beam was designed by Aston Webb and erected to mark the Diamond Jubilee of Queen Victoria in 1897. It is made of sequoia wood. The current altar was installed in 1900, along with the current reredos, designed by the notable sculptor and woodcarver Harry Hems. The reredos is made of Caen stone accompanied by lapis lazuli mosaics, and depicts the risen Christ with the Archangels Michael and Gabriel. The altar, in memory of Rosa Adeline Gibbs (1874–97), is of Derbyshire alabaster with a Sicilian marble slab top, and base and jambs of Devonshire marble. Hems and his company also made the wooden choir stalls, which were installed in 1902 to mark the coronation of Edward VII and Alexandra that year, and the wooden pulpit, installed in 1903.

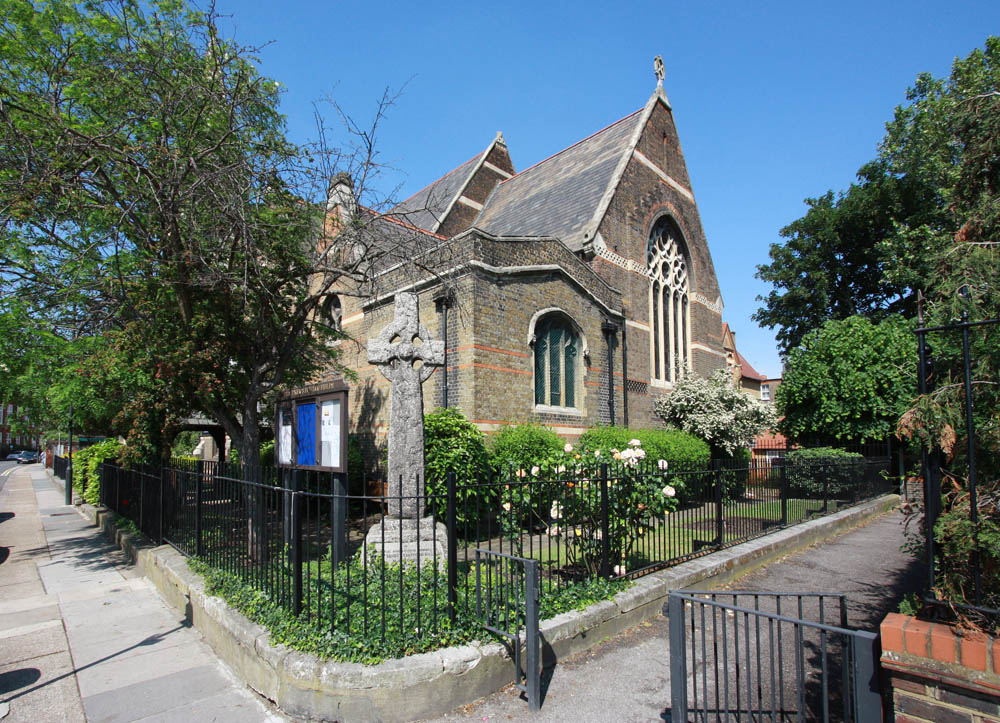
Eastern end

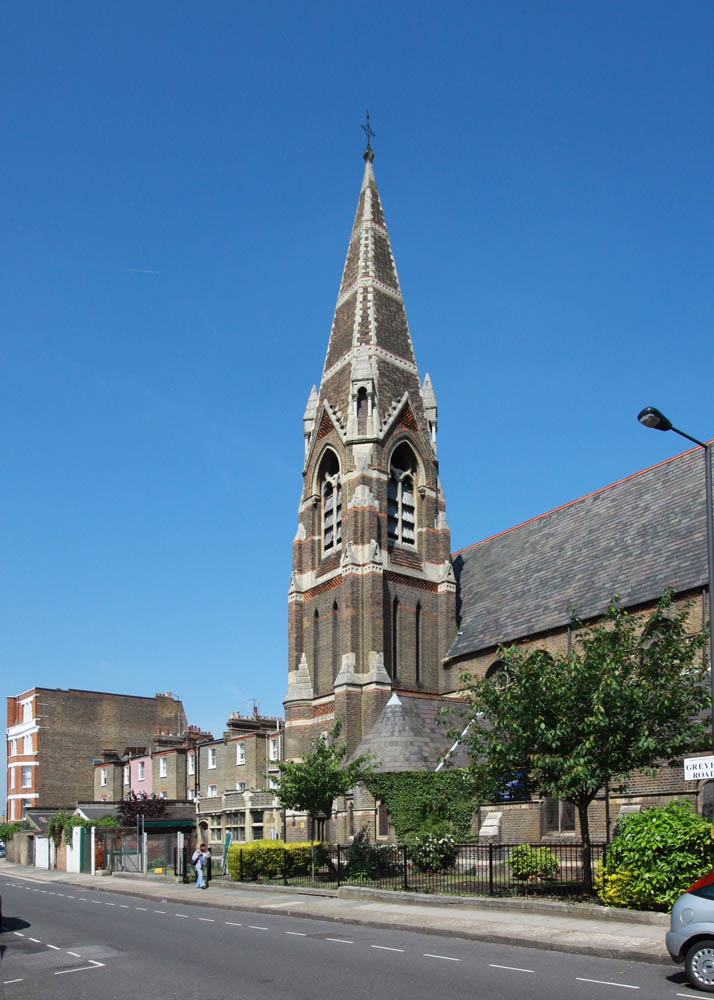
The tower and spire

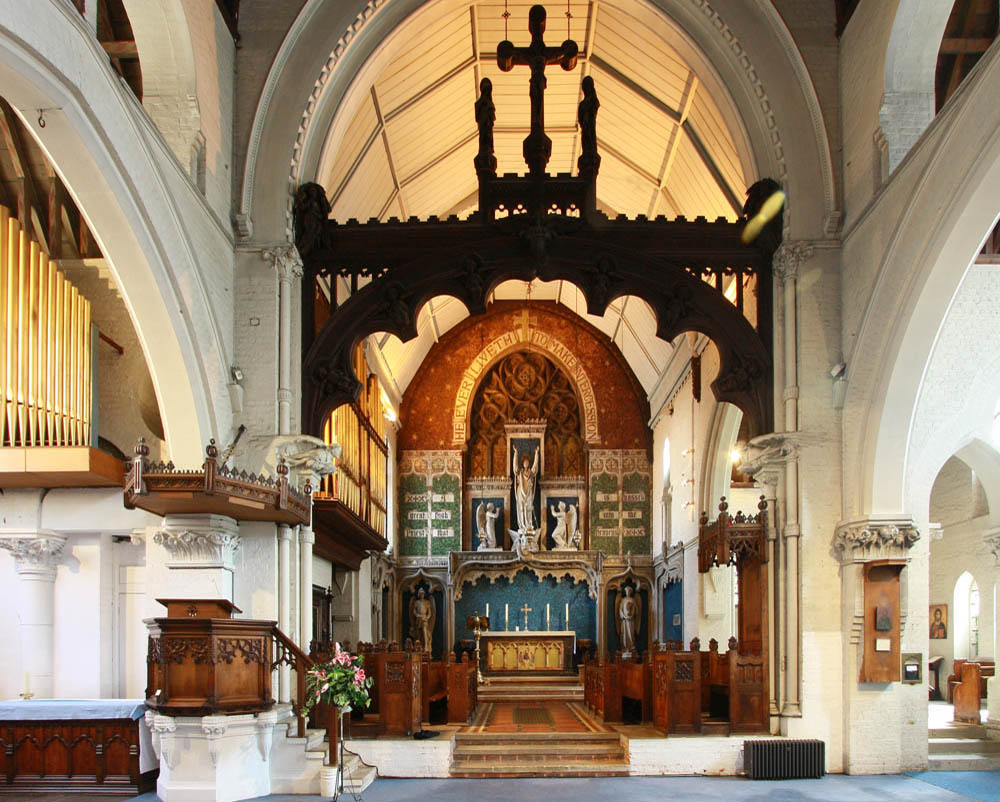
The rood screen

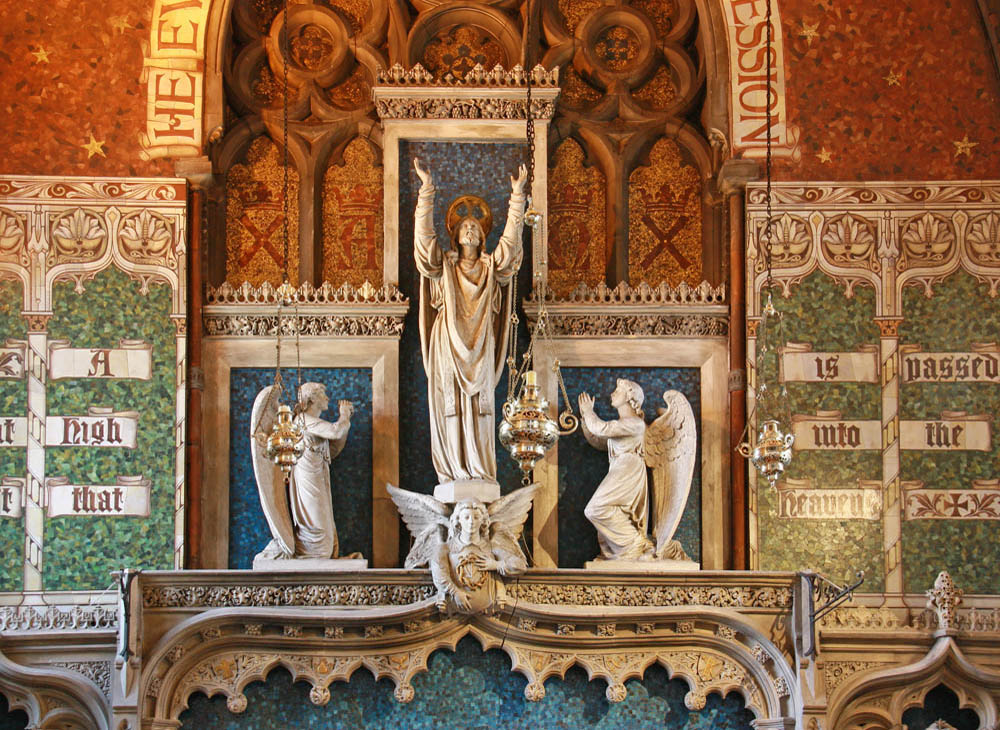
Detail of the reredos

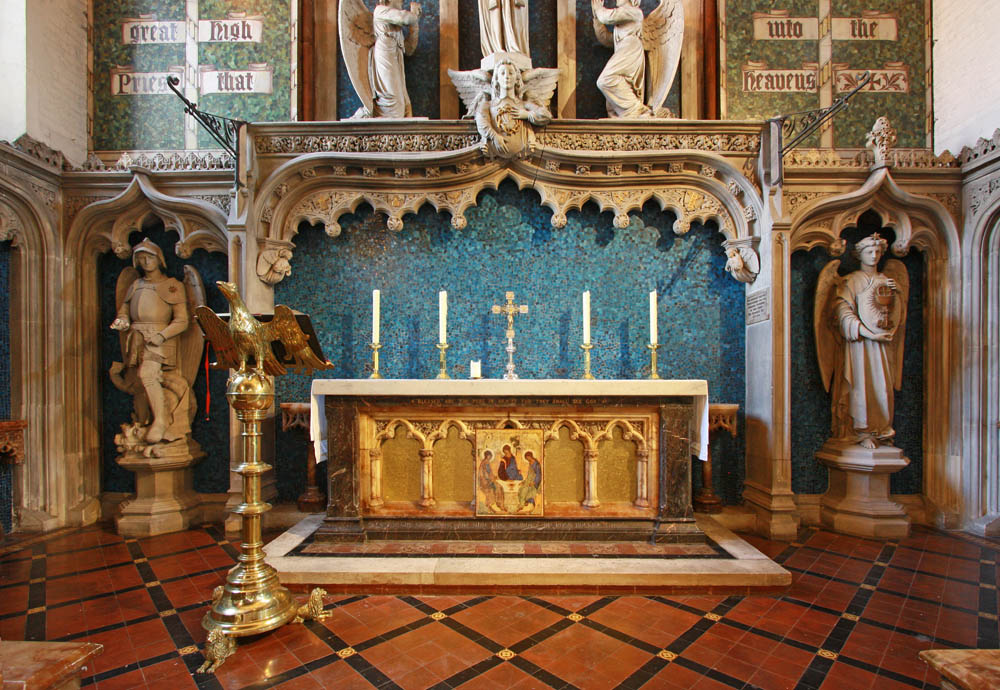
The altar

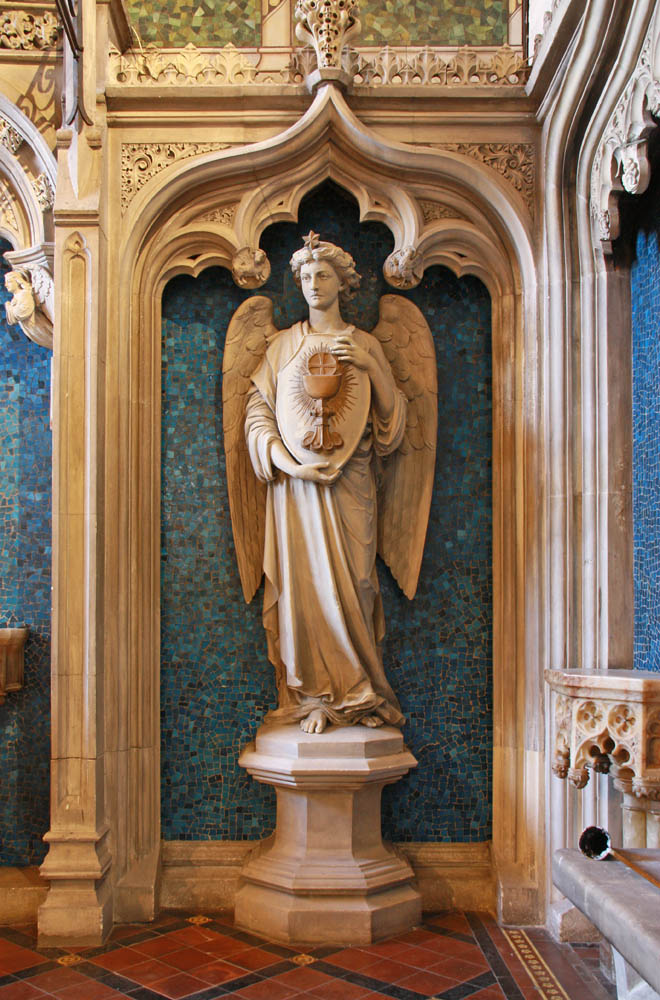
Statue of the Archangel Gabriel

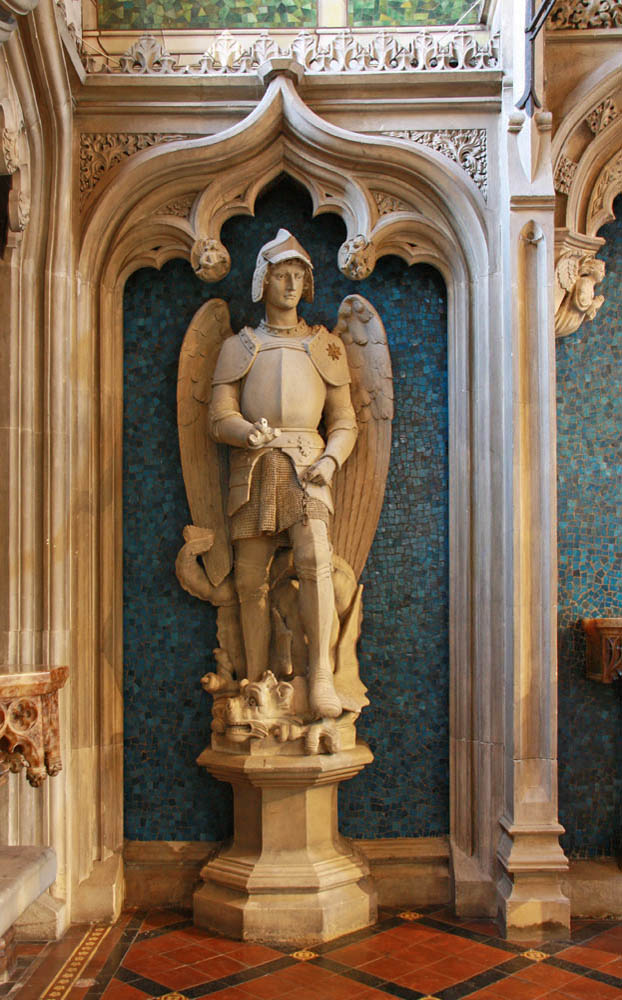
Statue of the Archangel Michael (minus the sword)

== Murder of David Paget ==
On 31 May 2001, the parishioners of St. Andrew's were shocked and saddened to hear that their vicar, the Reverend David Paget, had been stabbed to death in his own vicarage. He had failed to turn up to a Eucharist that morning and the church's treasurer entered the vicarage to discover his dead body lying there. He was described by one local as "a very happy guy who never had a problem with anyone" and "he would always be the sort of chap who would try and solve problems out". A parishioner remarked that "he was always free for anyone to talk to and I think this is why he got killed. He was vulnerable and he often had strange characters around. Nobody was bad in his eyes".

On 16 June 2001, the prime suspect was found dead next to a tower block in east London. It was later revealed that the murder had been committed by David Watkins, a young man from Bethnal Green whom the vicar had taken to his home for counselling, who committed suicide afterwards aged 29.
