= Ingelow =

Ingelow is a surname. Notable people with the surname include:

- Benjamin Ingelow (1835–1926), British architect
- Jean Ingelow (1820–1897), British poet and novelist
