= West Kensington =

Coordinates: 51.4907°N 0.2065°W

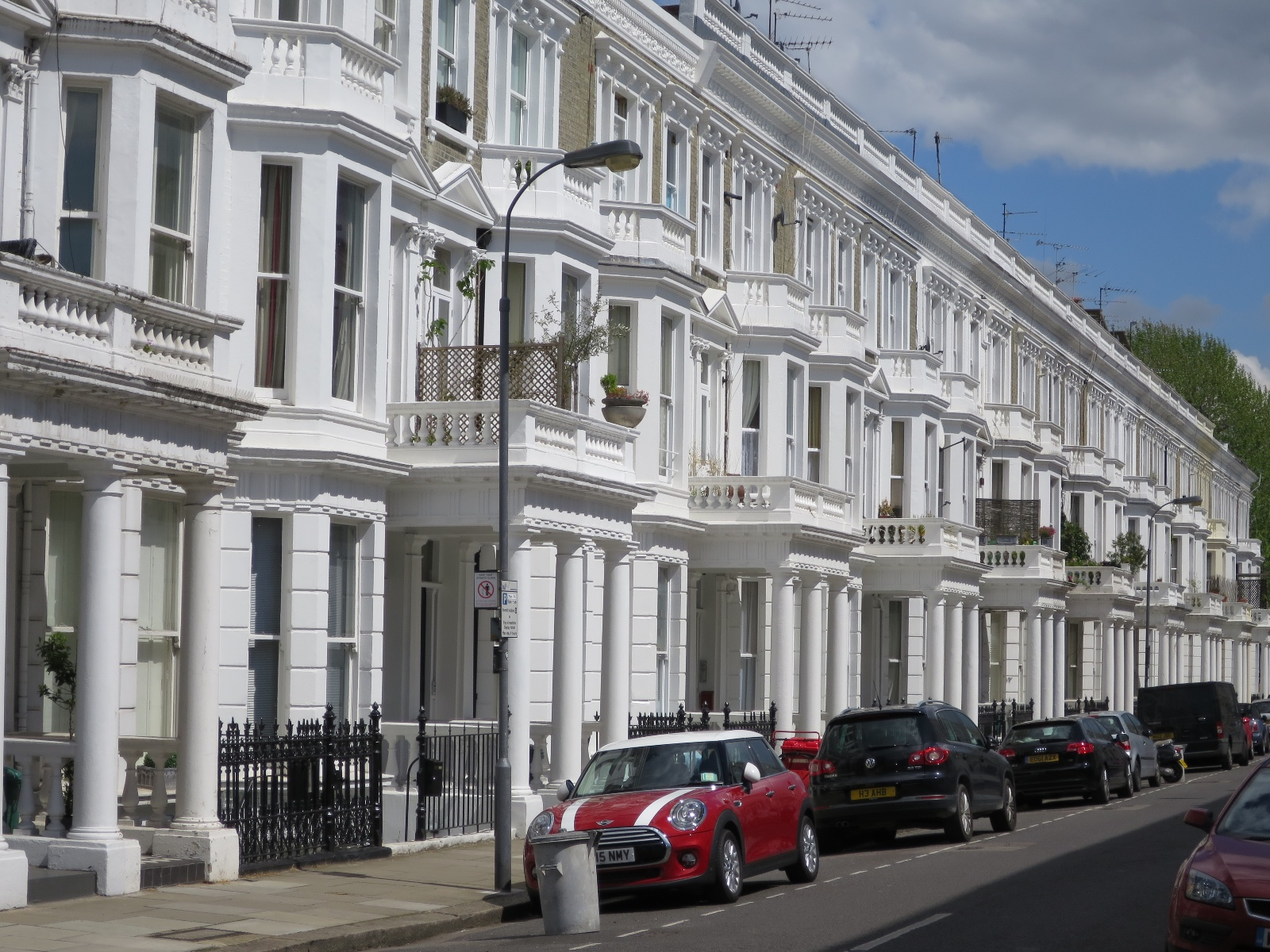
- Perham Road, West Kensington

- Location within Greater London
- OS grid reference: TQ246783
- London borough: Hammersmith & Fulham
- Ceremonial county: Greater London
- Region: London
- Country: England
- Sovereign state: United Kingdom
- Post town: LONDON
- Postcode district: W14
- Dialling code: 020
- Police: Metropolitan
- Fire: London
- Ambulance: London
- UK Parliament: Chelsea and Fulham
- London Assembly: West Central

West Kensington, formerly North End, is an area in the ancient parish of Fulham, in the London Borough of Hammersmith and Fulham, England, 3.4 miles (5.5 km) west of Charing Cross. It covers most of the London postal area of W14, including the area around Barons Court tube station, and is defined as the area between Lillie Road to the south, Fulham Palace Road to the west, Hammersmith Road to the north, and West Brompton and Earl's Court to the east. The area is bisected by the major London artery the A4, locally known as the Talgarth Road. Its main local thoroughfare is the North End Road.

It is predominantly a dense residential area with the Queen's Club in its midst and is bordered by the Lillie Bridge railway depot, the now defunct Earls Court Exhibition Centre site, Olympia Exhibition Centre and the commercial centres at Fulham and Hammersmith Broadway.

== Name ==
"West Kensington" is an early marketing construct, a ploy by two Victorian developers who found they had trouble selling their rapidly erected estate of terraced housing in the hamlet of North End on the outskirts of the village of Walham Green. In 1876 William Henry Gibbs and John P. Flew, builders from Dorset, decided to capitalise on their modest success in Kensington, by speculatively building 1,200 houses on the market gardens west of the West London Railway in Fulham. However, the housing slump of the 1880s left them with many unsold properties. They succeeded in persuading the Metropolitan Borough of Fulham to have North End renamed 'West Kensington' to attract new investors to their empty houses.

== History ==
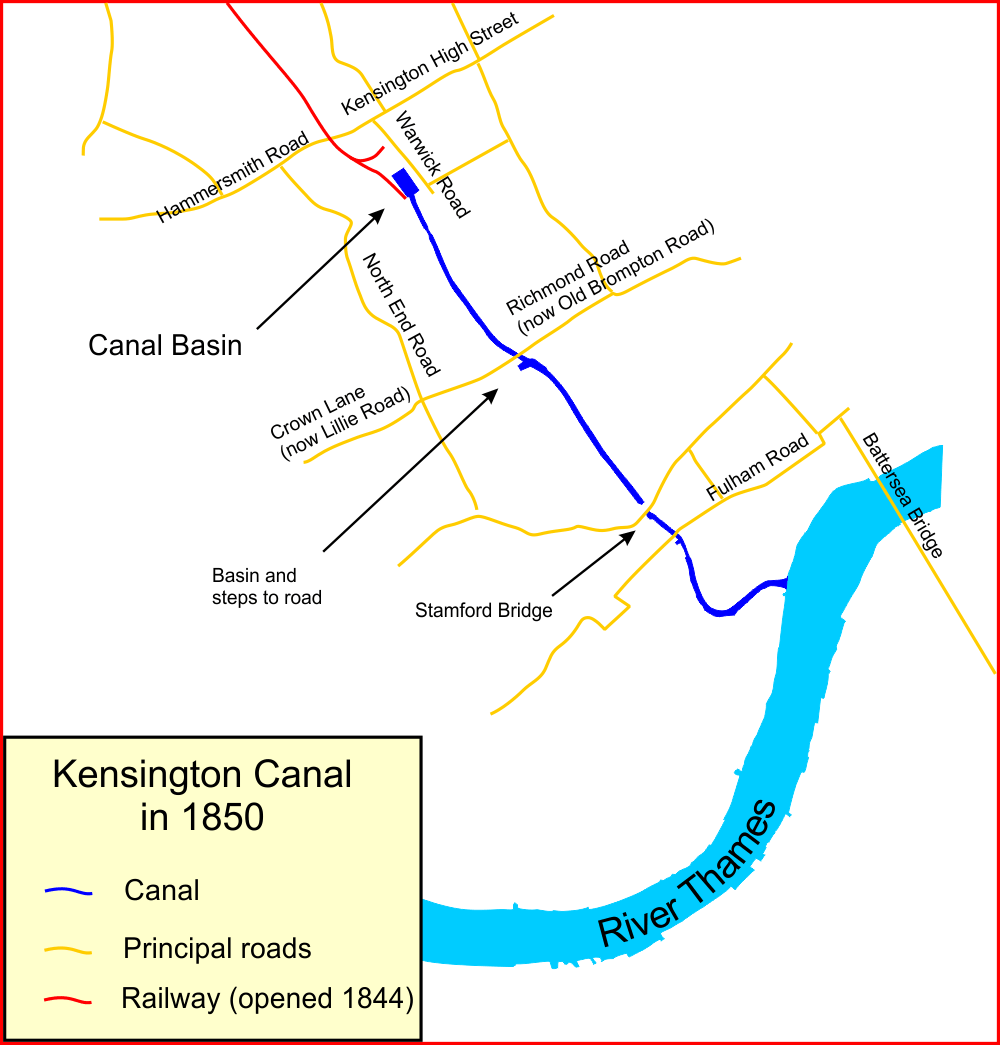
Kensington Canal 1850

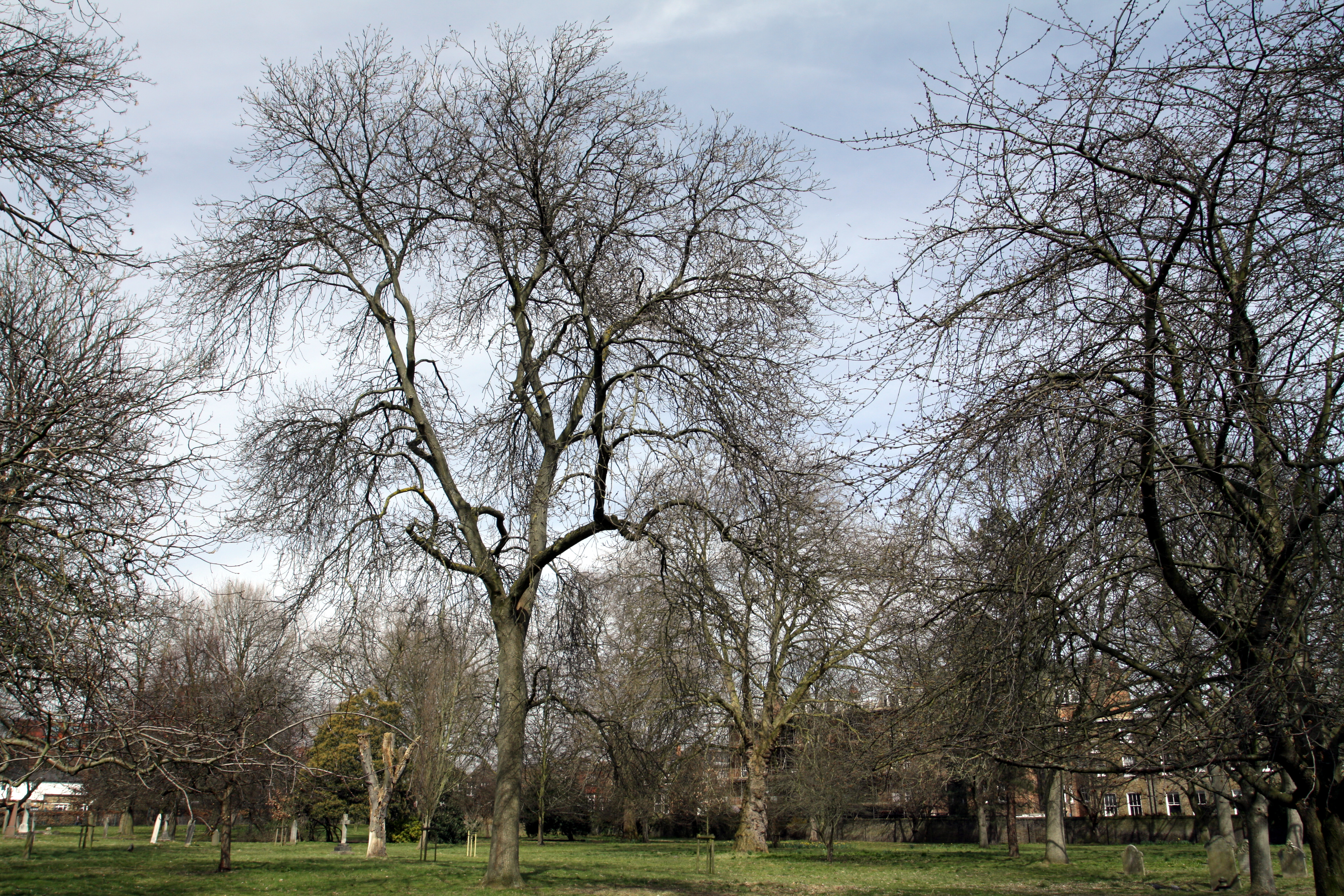
Margravine Cemetery

A map showing the wards of Fulham Metropolitan Borough as they appeared in 1916.

From the High Middle Ages, the hamlet of North End in the County of Middlesex was mainly farmland and market gardens, with a few scattered houses along North End Lane which wound its way from Walham Green to the trunk road linking the parishes of Hammersmith and Kensington. The main topographical feature was Counter's Creek, a tributary of the Thames River, rising in Kensal Green, which marked the parish boundary. Among the notable residents who had settled in this quiet rural retreat were Samuel Richardson, Samuel Foote, Francesco Bartolozzi, Sir John Lillie and then in the late 19th century, the artists Edward and Georgiana Burne-Jones.

The quiet of North End was sorely disturbed from 1824 onwards when local landowner William Edwardes, 2nd Baron Kensington, along with several others, decided to cash in on the already waning canal boom by converting a section of Counter's Creek into the Kensington Canal. It was not a success. Eventually the canal was filled in, and in mid 19th century it became a railway and the creek was turned into a sewer. With it came gradual urbanisation, which drew in various developers including Gibbs and Flew. Apart from their unsold houses, there was the problem of accessibility. A bridge was needed over the railways, but despite Gibbs and Flew trying to finance it, it led to their bankruptcy and the dissolution of the partnership in 1885. Gibbs and Flew thereafter carried on separate businesses with a measure of success in Fulham.

=== Barons Court ===
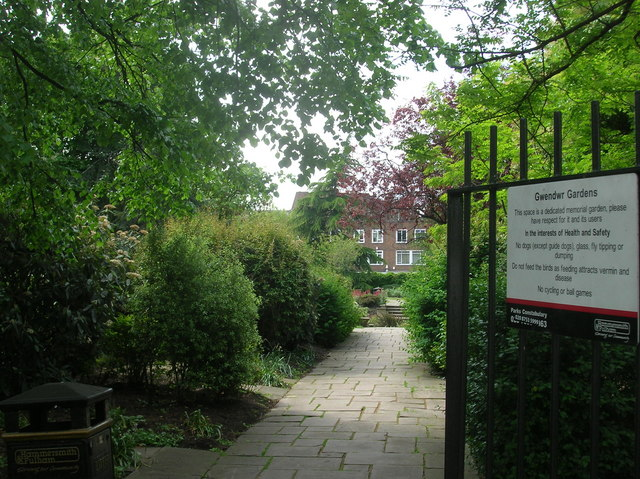
Gwendwr Gardens, Gwendwr Road W14

Margravine Cemetery and some of the streets near Barons Court station, recall the brief sojourn in the County of Middlesex of the last Margrave of Brandenburg, Alexander, Margrave of Brandenburg-Ansbach (1736-1806) and his second wife, the English Lady Elizabeth Craven, who in 1792 bought the handsome mansion on the Thames at Fulham, originally built by Sir Nicholas Crisp in the 17th century and renamed it "Brandenburg House". After the Margrave died, his wife, the Margravine, occupied it till her retirement to Naples in 1819. Between 1820 and 1822 it was lent by the Margravine to Caroline of Brunswick, the estranged consort of King George IV who lived and died there. After Queen Caroline's death, the Margravine first sold off the contents of the house, then had the property demolished and sold the grounds for industrial development. Part went to the Haig distillery, the rest was bought for a sugar refinery.

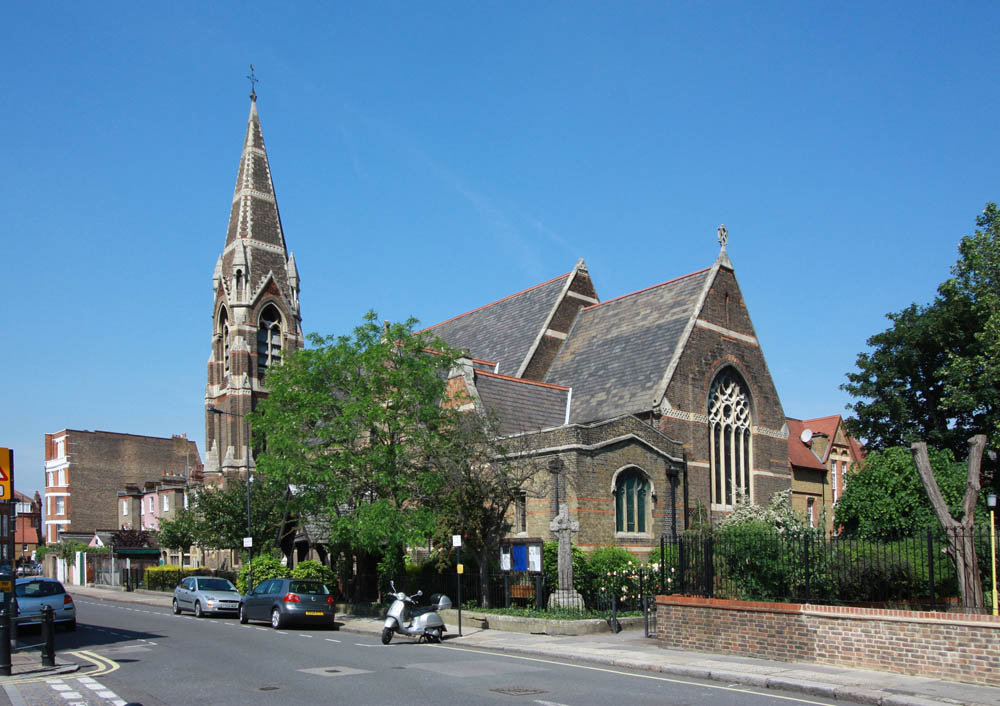
St Andrew's Church

Another local landowner and developer in the 19th century was the Irish-born politician Sir William Palliser. It is possible that the station built on Palliser's land and opened in 1874, was named after the Irish estate of the Earls of Abercorn, Baronscourt in County Tyrone where Palliser may have had connections. As well as Palliser Road itself, a group of roads in West Kensington are named after members of his family. They include: Perham, Charleville, Gledstanes, Barton, Fairholme, Comeragh, Castletown and Vereker Roads and Challoner Street. He also owned the 11 acres (45,000 m^{2}) which would become the Queen's Club. However, as he was heavily in debt when he died suddenly in 1882, his family did not benefit from his deals.

A contemporary of Palliser was Sir Robert Gunter whose family also left its mark on a number of streets that were built on his North End estate. They are Gunterstone Road, Edith Road and Edith Villas in memory of his daughter who died of scarlet fever, aged eight. After the severe bomb and landmine damage to the area during World War II, the Gunter estate donated Gwendwr Gardens, formerly the Cedars Lawn Tennis Club, to the public as a memorial to those who had perished.

=== Other developments ===
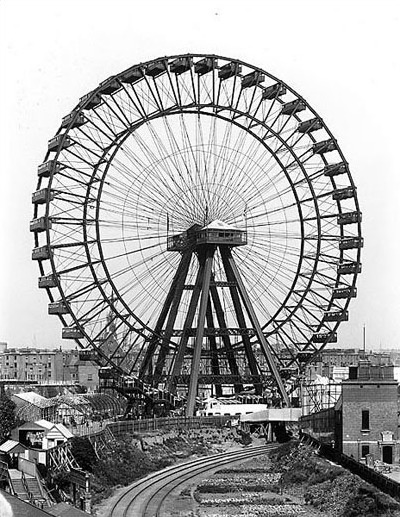
The Great Wheel at Earl's Court, erected for the India Exhibition

The railway developments at North End included the Lillie Bridge Depot, an important historic engineering workshop with secondary access from Beaumont Avenue since 1872. The Earls Court Exhibition pleasure gardens, an international venue, was begun by John Robinson Whitley, visited by Queen Victoria in her Jubilee year, and subsequently frequented by the Royal Household. The royal connection continued through the decades and Diana, Princess of Wales opened the barrel-shaped Earls Court II hall, which in 1991 straddled the boundary between Hammersmith and Fulham and Kensington and Chelsea; but after a confidential decision taken by the two boroughs in 2008, demolition began in 2015. The entire venue was closed down in 2014. Other notable structures on the site were the giant Ferris wheel (1895-1907) and the 6,000 seat Empress Hall (1894), built for impresario Imre Kiralfy, both long gone.

The campaign for a bridge into West Kensington from nearby Earl's Court was taken up by local residents and the West Cromwell Road bridge was eventually commenced in 1938 and, interrupted by World War II, was opened in 1942.

=== Terrorism incident ===
On 26 February 1975, Stephen Tibble, a 22 year old police officer of the Metropolitan Police, was fatally shot by Liam Quinn, a member of the Provisional IRA, after a chase near Barons Court tube station. It was later discovered that a flat on Fairholme Road was used by the IRA and Quinn himself as a 'bomb factory'.

== Housing stock ==
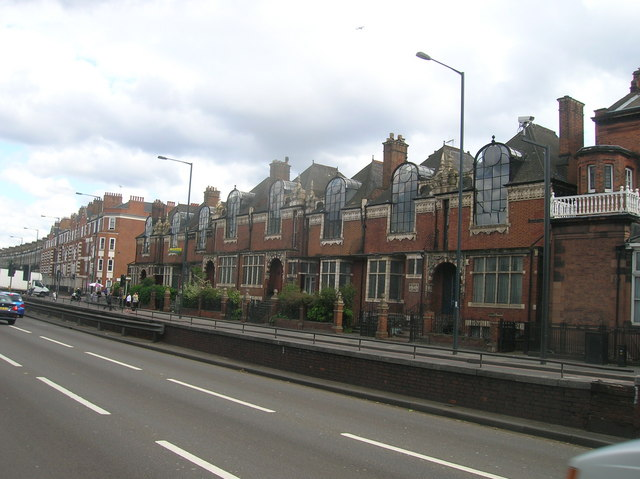
St Paul's Studios, Talgarth Road

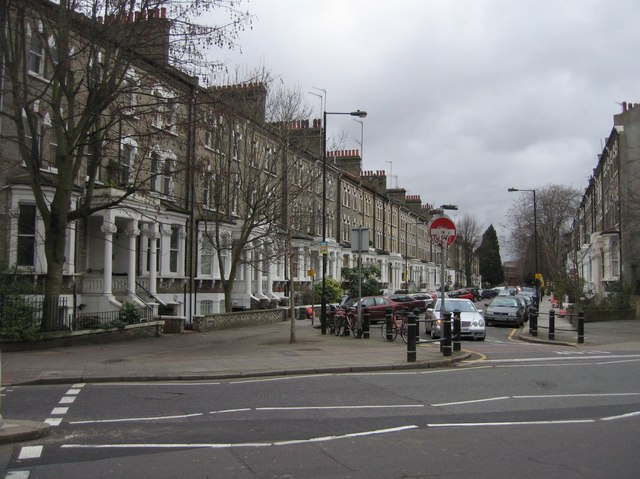
Edith Road, West Kensington

West Kensington is primarily a residential area consisting mainly of Victorian terraced houses, many of which are subdivided into flats. There are some interesting examples of Victorian architecture, with several houses and some entire streets listed – including the imposing mansion blocks of Fitzgeorge Avenue (off North End Road) and the mansion blocks around Avonmore Road including, Glyn Mansions (Built 1897), Avonmore Mansions and Avonmore Gardens (Built 1893) which is located next to the new Kensington Village development. Ada Lewis House on Palliser Road was built in the 1920s to help women that needed support and despite local campaigns it was acquired by Southern Housing and demolished which a removal of historic trees. In 2025 the new development was reopened by Southern Housing who commissioned London-based artist Jenny Kay to create new stained glass to reflect the history of Ada Lewis House.

West Kensington Court was purpose built and completed in 1938 with a view of providing what were considered at the time luxury flats for young professionals and families wishing to move from older-style properties. There are also a number of ex-local authority and local authority buildings around the North End Road, including the recently renovated Lytton Estate. Many of buildings have been sold off. A more recent private development, St Paul's Court, was built in 1980 on part of the vast former site of St Paul's School.

Since much of the housing is in the rented sector, West Kensington has become a cosmopolitan enclave. There are significant populations of Arabs, Americans, Australians, New Zealanders, Irish, Italians, Spaniards, and French, encouraged by nearby private schools teaching in their native language can be found around Brook Green. The area also has a large student population, serving Imperial College London, Charing Cross Hospital, South Kensington, Hammersmith and other Central London Universities.

Avonmore Road, built in the 1880s, has been dubbed "Kensington Village". Whiteleys Furniture Repositories, laundry and stables, built along the West London line, belonged to London's first department store in Westbourne Grove. The high-ceilinged Warwick Building was used as a depository for Whiteleys-sourced furnishings (grand pianos, chaise longues, oriental room dividers, mahogany wardrobes) for the use of customers who were resident in the colonies. Kensington Village now consists of a blend of modernised Victorian buildings, such as the Warwick Building, and modern additions such as the Pembroke Building, built in a similar style with London stock brick and red lintels and full-height glazing.

== Commerce, education and religion ==
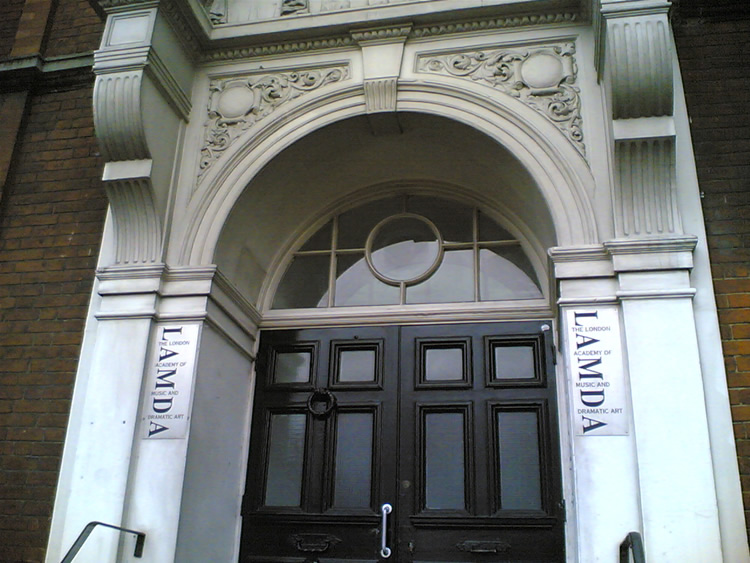
The LAMDA building in Talgarth Road

Local business consists of small shops, offices and restaurants, with the Olympia Exhibition Centre nearby. West Kensington is within easy reach of Earl's Court, and the Broadways of Fulham and Hammersmith. There are several pubs and hotels, including The Albion public house, which is reputedly haunted. The Baron's Court Theatre is located in the basement of The Curtains Up bar and restaurant. One of the oldest extant Polish Patisserie-delicatessens in London, Prima, was opened in North End Road in 1946. For several decades after World War II, the editorial offices of the Polish Daily, the UK's oldest Polish language paper, were located in Charleville Road.

In February 2009, the W14 postcode became the first London postal area without a post office, until a sub-post office agreement was reached with the retail outlet, North End News.

=== Education ===
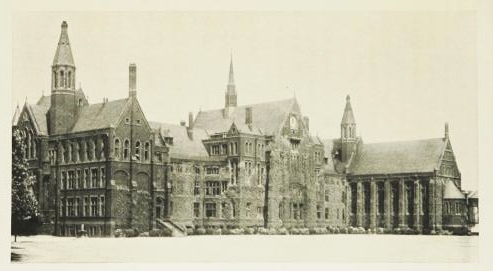
St Paul's School, West Kensington-Hammersmith, 1900

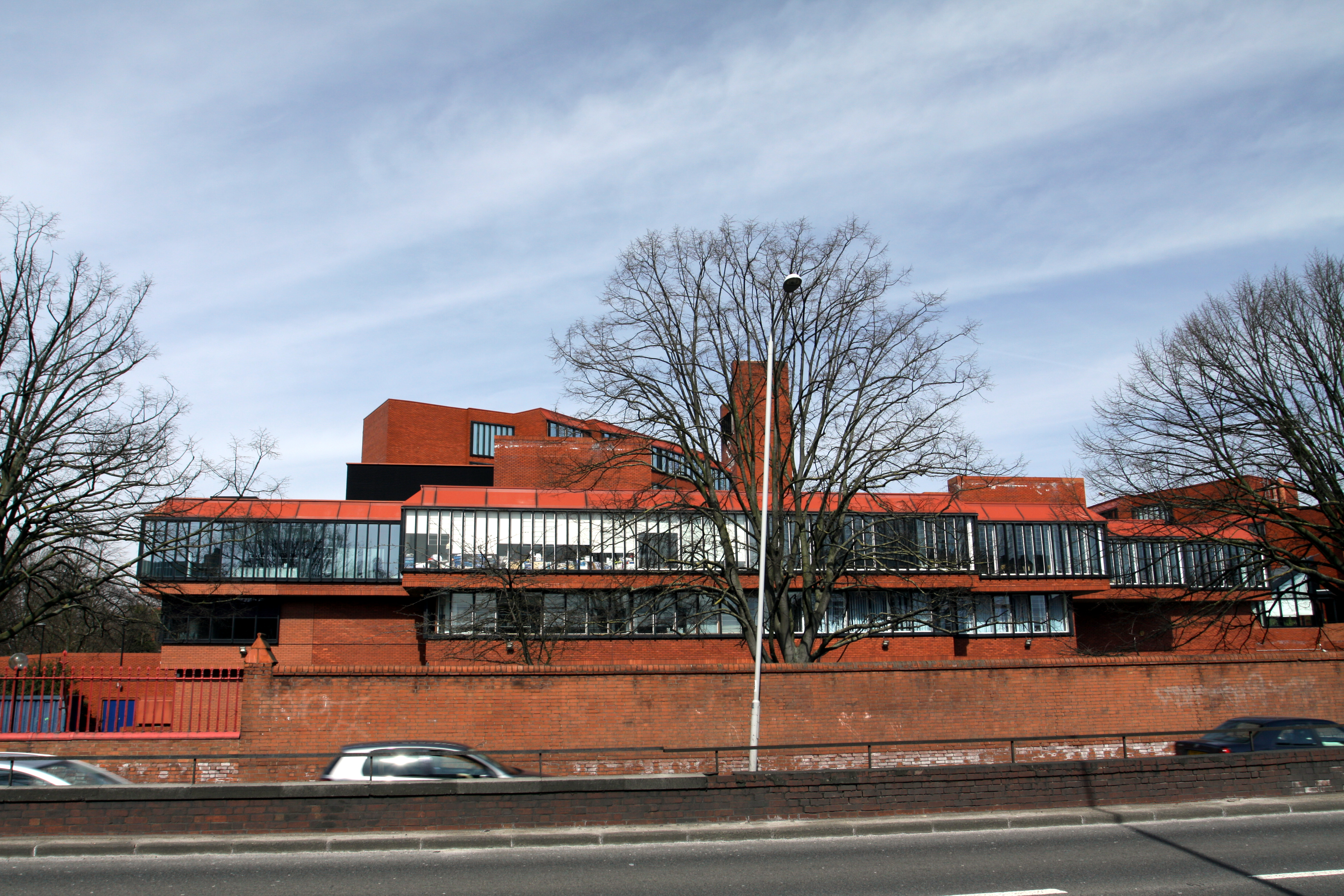
Hammersmith Campus of the Ealing, Hammersmith and West London College on Talgarth Road

West Kensington once had on its fringes the dominating presence of a terracotta cluster of Neo Gothic buildings amid lush playing fields, of St Paul's School backing onto the Talgarth Road, between 1884 and 1968. It has since migrated to its fifth set of buildings now south of the Thames river in Barnes, since it left, centuries ago, the old cathedral cloister in the City of London. A junior feeder school which moved with it, was the preparatory Colet Court, started in Edith Road in 1881, then on Hammersmith Road and is now renamed St Paul's Juniors in Barnes. In the late 1970s, environmentalists unsuccessfully campaigned against the Greater London Council to stop redevelopment of the St. Paul's School playing fields. Part of the old St Paul's site in Hammersmith is now occupied by one of four campuses of the FE Ealing, Hammersmith and West London College, and by the Parayhouse Educational facility. West Kensington has two St James Independent Schools, for juniors and senior girls. Fulham Boys School, a new independent school, has been temporarily housed in a former Local education authority special school on Mund Street W14, while the Fulham Police station site off Fulham Broadway becomes the school's new premises.

The London Academy of Music and Dramatic Art (LAMDA), one of UK's leading theatre schools, moved in 2005 into the former premises of the Royal Ballet School at 153-155 Talgarth Road, after years in Earl's Court.

=== Religion ===
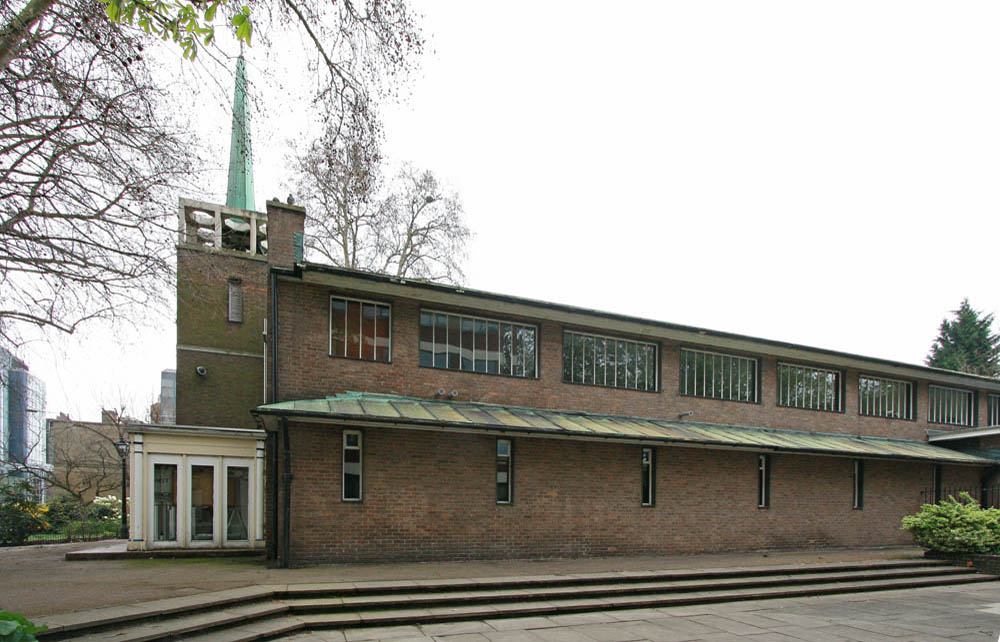
St Mary's, Hammersmith Road

Despite its name, the church of St Andrew's, Fulham Fields is located in West Kensington. It was built by Newman and Billing in 1873, consecrated in 1874, and enlarged by Aston Webb and Ingress Bell in 1894.

West Kensington's main parish church, St Mary's, is located in Hammersmith Road, near the junction with Edith Road. The original church building was built in 1813 and given its own parish in 1836. In June 1944 the church building was completely destroyed by a V1 flying bomb. The present church building dates from the 1960s.

== Politics ==
West Kensington is part of the West Kensington ward for elections to Hammersmith and Fulham London Borough Council.

== In popular culture ==
Blythe House has been used as a filming location for numerous films including Tinker Tailor Soldier Spy.

In the film Trainspotting, the flat that Renton shows the young couple around when he gets the job as an estate agent and ultimately stashes Begbie and Sickboy in is 78A North End Road, opposite West Kensington tube station.

The Nashville Rooms, now the Famous Three Kings pub, hosted many rock and punk concerts in the 1970s and early 1980s. Joy Division, The Sex Pistols and The Police all played there regularly.

In Hanif Kureishi's novel The Buddha of Suburbia, the main character moves from the southern suburbs of London to West Kensington and lives by the Nashville. He witnesses one of the first presentations of a punk band, probably The Sex Pistols.

The flat featured in the 1969 BBC series 'Take Three Girls' was at 17 Glazbury Road.

The 2005 Woody Allen film Match Point was shot on location at Queen's Club and in the surrounding residential streets.

Heather Graham and Mia Kirshner play upper-middle-class dilettantes from West Kensington in the 2008 movie Buy Borrow Steal.

== Notable people ==
- Edward and Georgiana Burne-Jones, he a Pre-Raphaelite painter, she a writer, resided at the Grange, in what is now the Lytton Estate, West Kensington.
- John Melhuish Strudwick, Pre-Raphaelite painter, resided at Edith Villas during the 1880s and into the 1890s.
- Maude Goodman a.k.a. Matilda Scanes, artist, resided at Edith Villas until 1894, and then 7 Addison Crescent until her death in 1938. From 1938 to 1968 the Maude Goodman Studio operated musical recitals there with Dame Eva Turner as president.
- Nada Bashir, journalist and correspondent, moved to West Kensington in her teen years
- Edward Compton, actor-manager lived and died at 54 Avonmore Road.
- William Crathern, composer, was organist of St Mary's, West Kensington (at that time known as North End).
- Edward Elgar, composer, lived at 51 Avonmore Road, W14, 1890–1891.
- Peg Entwistle, Broadway actress whose 1932 suicide from atop the Hollywood Sign forever tagged her as "The Hollywood Sign Girl", had her earliest childhood at 53 Comeragh Road.
- Estelle, rapper, was born and raised in West Kensington; her song "1980" was written about growing up in the area.
- Charles James Feret, Fulham historian, editor of the Fulham Chronicle and author of Fulham Old and New (1900), lived in Edith Road.
- Mahatma Gandhi, lived on 20 Barons Court Road (West Kensington) while studying law.
- Marcus Garvey, Pan Africanist, founder of the Black Star Line shipping company and the Universal Negro Improvement Association and African Communities League, lived and died in West Kensington.

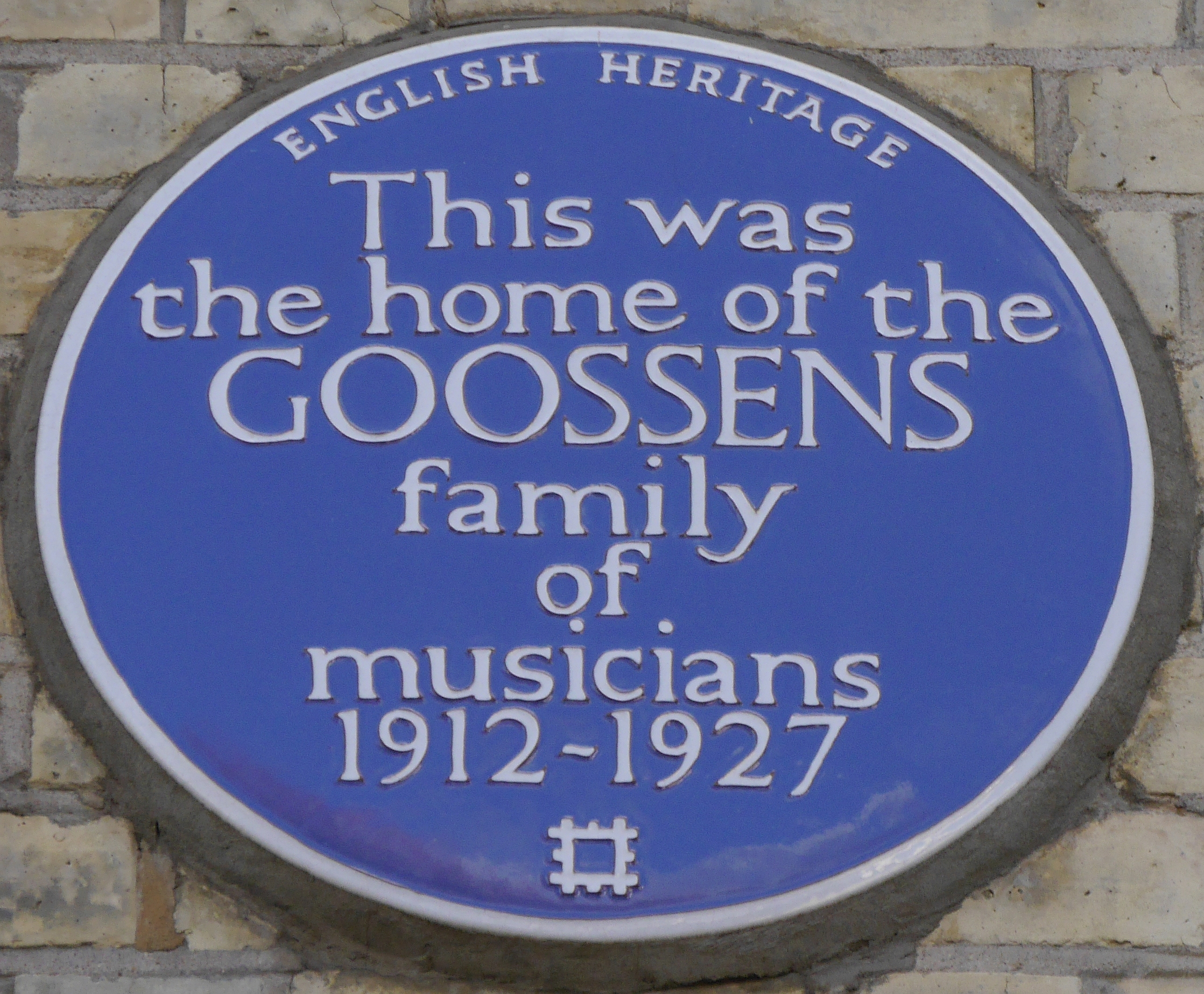
Goossens Family Blue Plaque in Edith Road

- Eugène Goossens, fils, Belgian musician, his singer wife, Annie Cook and their children, Sir Eugène Goossens, conductor, harpists, Sidonie Goossens and Marie Goossens and brothers, Adolphe and Léon, horn and oboe players respectively, lived at 70, Edith Road West. A blue plaque commemorates them.
- Sir Robert Gunter was a Yorkshire and Chelsea-based member of the wealthy landowning confectioners, the Gunter family, who developed large swathes of West London. Street names like Gunterstone and Edith commemorate Gunter family members.
- Henry Rider Haggard, author, lived for several years in Gunterstone Road and wrote King Solomon's Mines and She while there.
- Adelaide Hall Jazz singer and entertainer lived at 54A Fairholme Road until her death in 1993.
- Stephen Hester, chief executive, Royal Bank of Scotland
- James Hunt, Formula 1 champion, lived in Normand Mews, 1980–82.
- James MacLaren, architect, designed 22 and 22A Avonmore Road for sculptor HR Pinker.
- Stirling Moss, British former Formula One racing driver, was born in West Kensington in 1929
- Sir William Palliser, Irish-born conservative politician who built several terraced streets in North End.
- Sir John Richard Robinson, journalist, manager and editor of the Daily News lived and died at 4 Addison Crescent.
- Bertram Fletcher Robinson, journalist, writer and editor, lived at 4 Addison Crescent with his uncle Sir John Richard Robinson between 1901 and 1902.
- Mary Ann Sieghart writer, broadcaster and assistant editor of The Times was born in the area.
- Sir John Tenniel (1820–1914), artist and cartoonist, lived at 52 FitzGeorge Avenue, West Kensington until his death on 25 February 1914.
- Antonia White was from Perham Road.
- William Worby Beaumont (1848-1929), engineer and inventor, lived at 76 Gunterstone Road. The local Beaumont Avenue is a memorial to him.
- William Butler Yeats lived in Edith Villas with his family in 1867.
- Fred Catling (1873-1947), owner of the Avonmore Collection, the first major collection of world banknotes in the UK, lived at 39 Avonmore Road.

== Transport ==
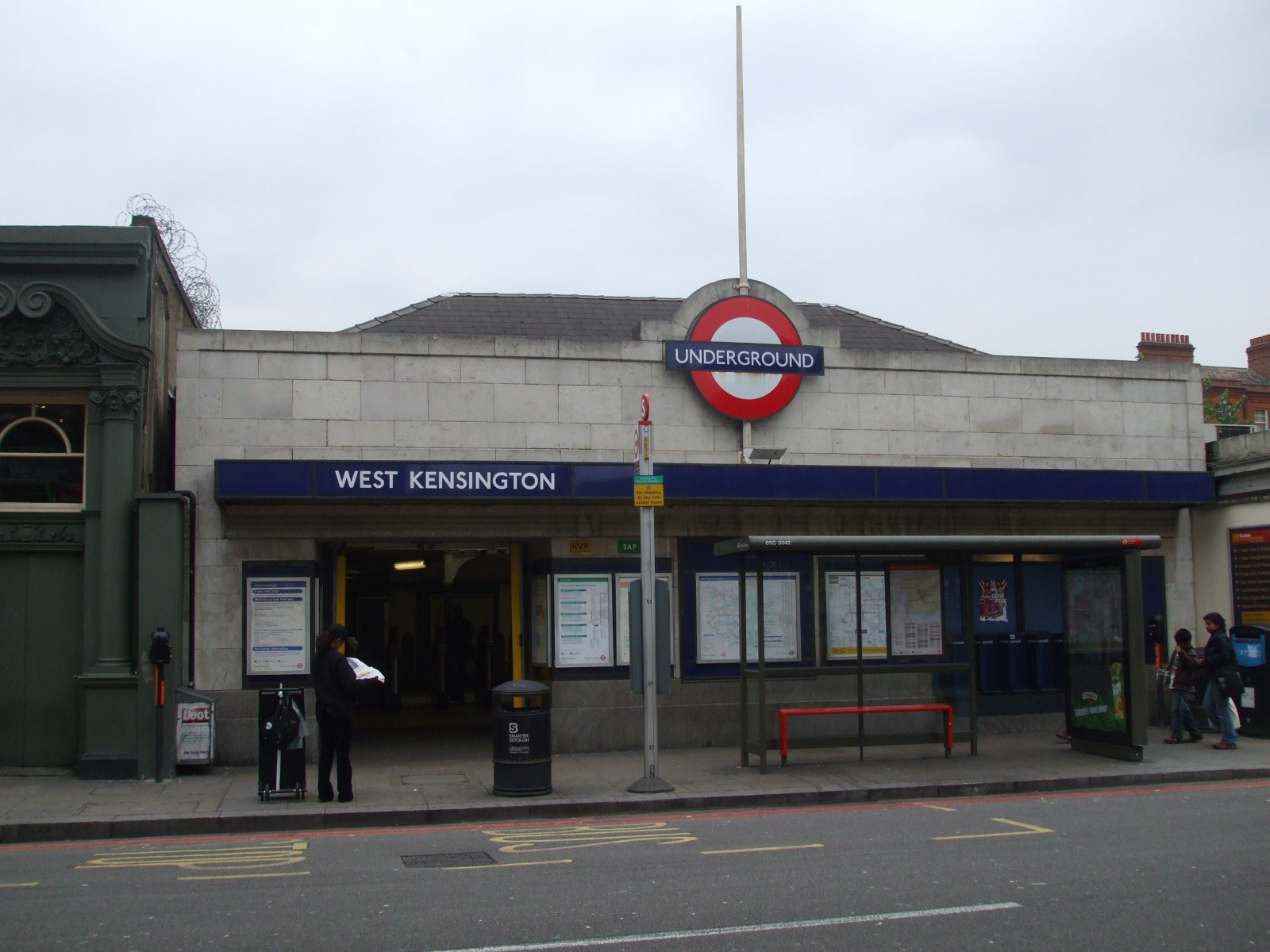
West Kensington station, formerly 'North End - Fulham', entrance

West Kensington is well served by public transport.

- There are three London Underground stations:
  - West Kensington (District line)
  - Barons Court (District and Piccadilly lines)
  - Kensington (Olympia) (District line and London Overground)
- There are seven more in the vicinity:
  - Hammersmith (District and Piccadilly lines)
  - Hammersmith (Circle and Hammersmith & City line lines)
  - Earl's Court (District and Piccadilly lines)
  - High Street Kensington (District line)
  - Fulham Broadway (District line)
  - West Brompton (District and London Overground)
  - Gloucester Road (District, Circle and Piccadilly lines)
  - Goldhawk Road (Hammersmith & City and Circle lines)
  - Shepherd's Bush (Central and Hammersmith & City lines)

West Kensington station is on the District line linking Upminster with Ealing Broadway station and Richmond. There is a branch line (running between Kensington Olympia-Earl's Court-Kensington High Street) and the Piccadilly line from Barons Court, the Hammersmith & City line from Hammersmith tube station, and the Central line from Shepherd's Bush and Holland Park.

- Overground: The London Overground is available from West Brompton station, Kensington (Olympia) station and Shepherd's Bush.
- Bus: Several Bus routes are available in the area including the 9, 23, 27, 28, 49, 306 and C1. Along Hammersmith Road, there are numerous buses linking the area to Acton, Aldwych, Chiswick, Hammersmith, King's Cross, Notting Hill, Oxford Street, Paddington, Richmond and Trafalgar Square. The N9 bus also runs from Olympia to Heathrow Airport via Isleworth and West Middlesex Hospital.
- Road: West Kensington is also close to the A4 (West Cromwell Road) with links to the West and Heathrow and High Street Kensington with links to the Central London/West End.

A local transport-related curiosity (and not open to the public) is the London Underground training centre that contains a mock-up station called West Ashfield tube station. It is located on the third floor of Ashfield House. Despite its recent erection, it is scheduled for demolition as part of the Earls Court Regeneration Scheme.

== Nearest locations and places of interest ==
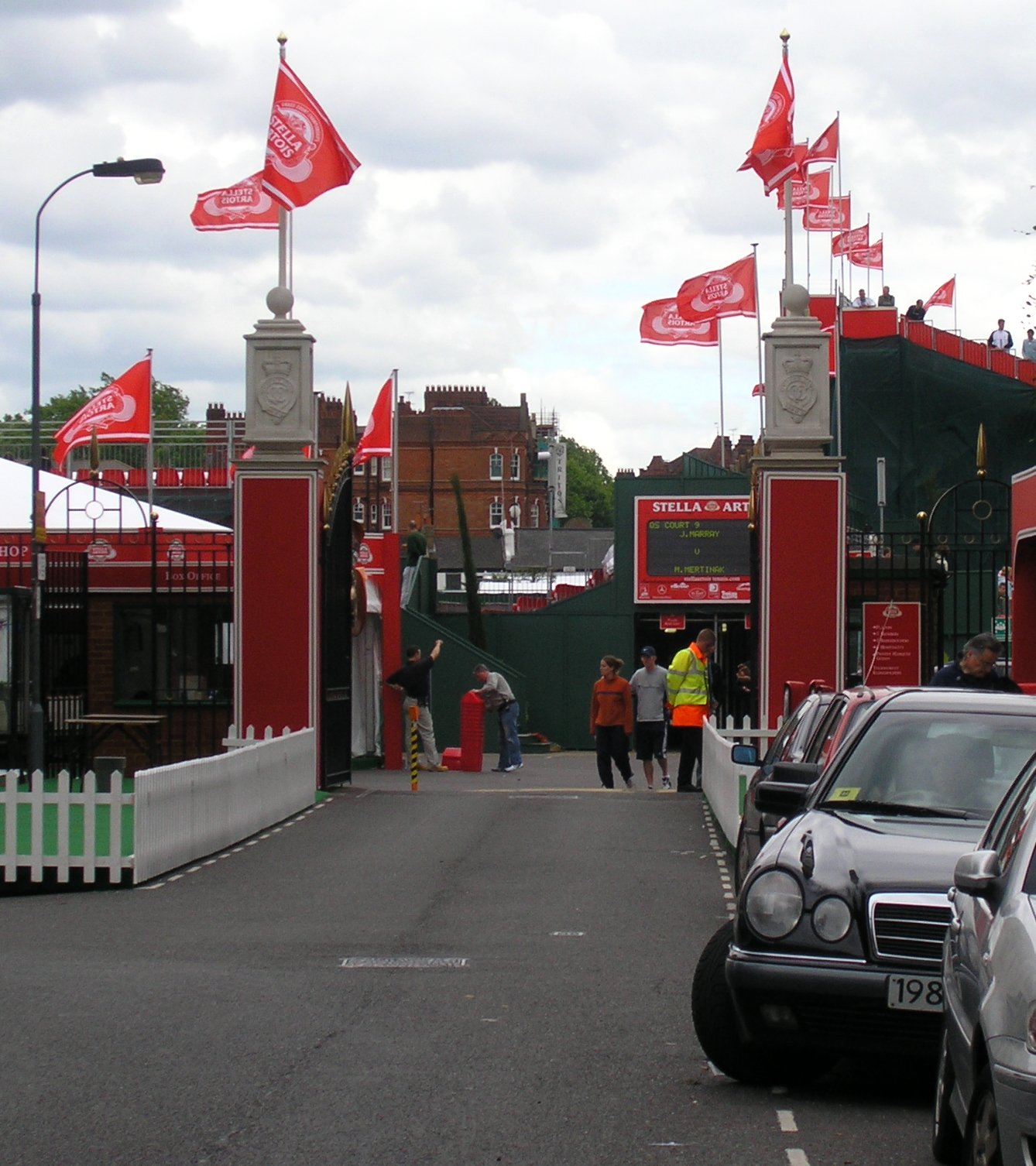
Entrance to Queen's Club during the 2005 Queen's Club Championships

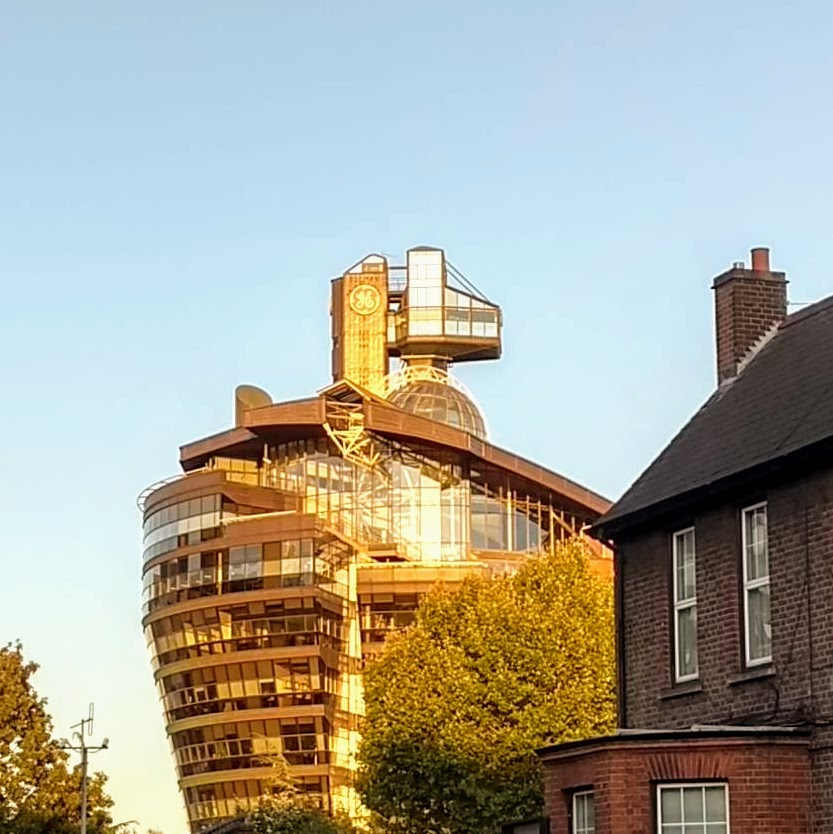
The Ark, Hammersmith

- Queen's Club – home to The Queen's Club Championships
- Olympia Exhibition Centre
- Margravine Cemetery, a green space in the area
- The Ark, London, a notable ship-shaped office block
- Sotheby's central London sales room is located at the Olympia
- Design Museum relocated from Shad Thames onto the site of the former Commonwealth Institute in Kensington High Street
- Lyric Theatre (Hammersmith)
- Riverside Studios, an arts centre re-opened by the Thames at Hammersmith
- Hammersmith Bridge
- Kelmscott House at 26 the Mall, Hammersmith, home of artist William Morris
- Blythe House stores and off-site facilities for Victoria & Albert, Science and British Museums
- North End Road Market
- Charing Cross Hospital
- Kensington High Street
- Holland Park
- Fulham Broadway
- Hammersmith Broadway
- Hammersmith Apollo
- Westfield London

== Future redevelopment ==
The London Borough of Hammersmith & Fulham and the Royal Borough of Kensington & Chelsea resolved in secret to go on to grant outline planning permission for developers' Capco Masterplan for the Earls Court Regeneration Project, with Transport for London having a 30% interest, and with the surprising cooperation of Historic England who were persuaded to grant a Certificate of Immunity from Listing (COIL), to enable the Art Deco structure to be demolished. The Lillie Bridge Depot was also in the frame and as it was claimed the Earls Court Project would bring considerable benefits to the area, it was recognised by the Mayor's London Plan, under Boris Johnson, as an Opportunity Area in July 2011. The project, expected to span 15–20 years, would involve the redevelopment of 80 acres of land around the Earl's Court Exhibition Centres and the West Kensington & Gibb's Green Estate and a swathe of private businesses and other homes. The proposals included the creation of "four new village centres" across North End Road, West Kensington, West Brompton and Earl's Court.

There was strong local and international opposition to the project which put thousands of people's homes, employment and businesses at permanent risk. The prevailing political and economic climate not only blighted the area but also the project. The developers sold on their loss-making venture in December 2019, while Hammersmith and Fulham Council have arranged with the buyers, Delancey to buy back the two housing estates still occupied by residents.
