= WEK =

Wek or WEK may refer to:

- Alek Wek (born 1977), South Sudanese-British model
- Hong Kong West Kowloon railway station, Hong Kong, MTR station code WEK
- West Kensington tube station, London, London Underground station code WEK
