= John Billing =

English architect (c. 1816–1863)

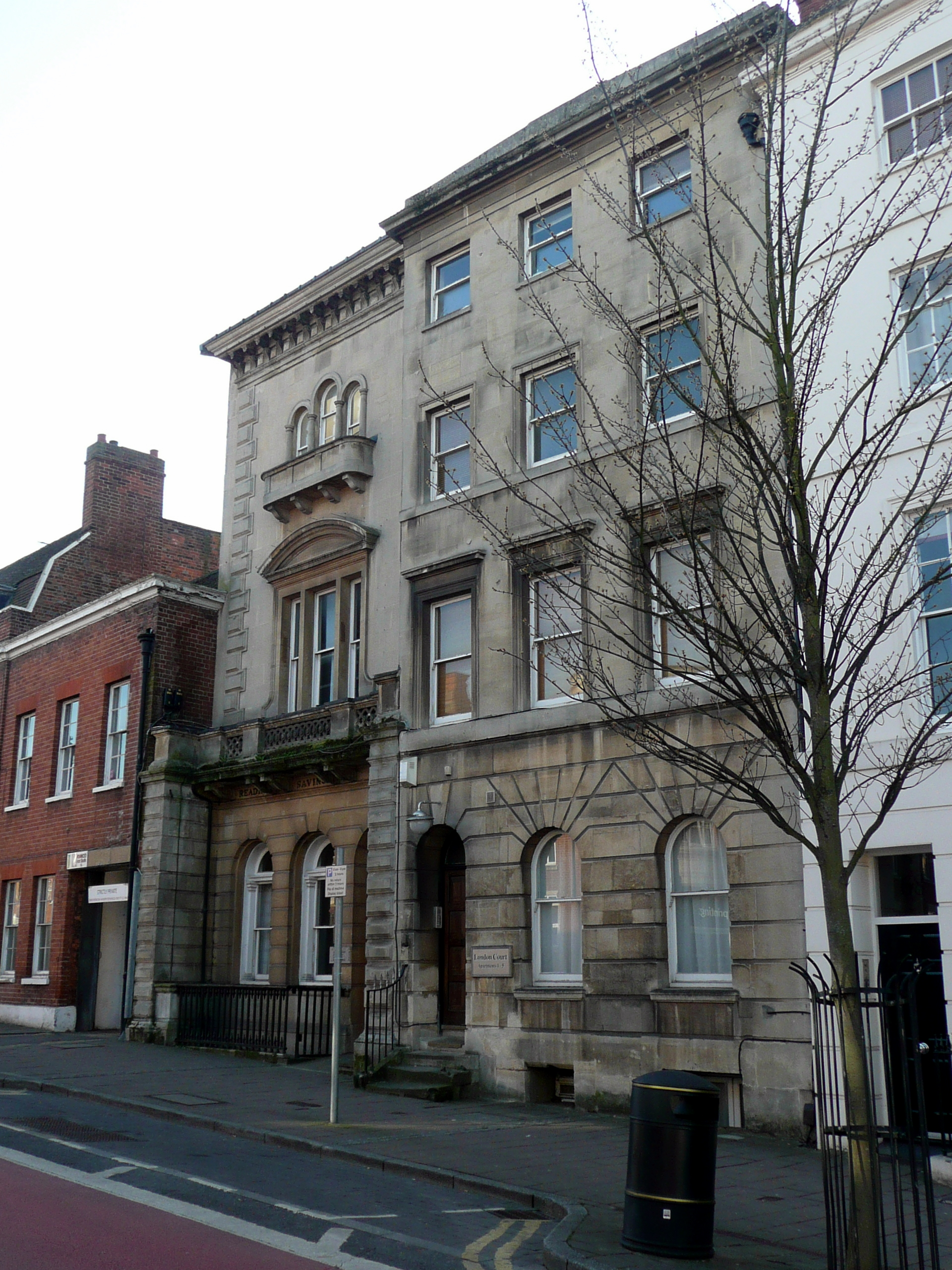
- Born: 1816 or 17
- Died: 1863
- Occupation: Architect
- Buildings: St. Giles' parish church, Tetsworth

John Billing, FRIBA was an English architect from Reading, Berkshire. His grandfather Richard Billing (circa 1747–1826), father Richard Billing (1784–1853), brothers Richard (1814–84) and Arthur (1824–96) and nephew Arthur Ernest (died 1920) were also architects.

== Career ==
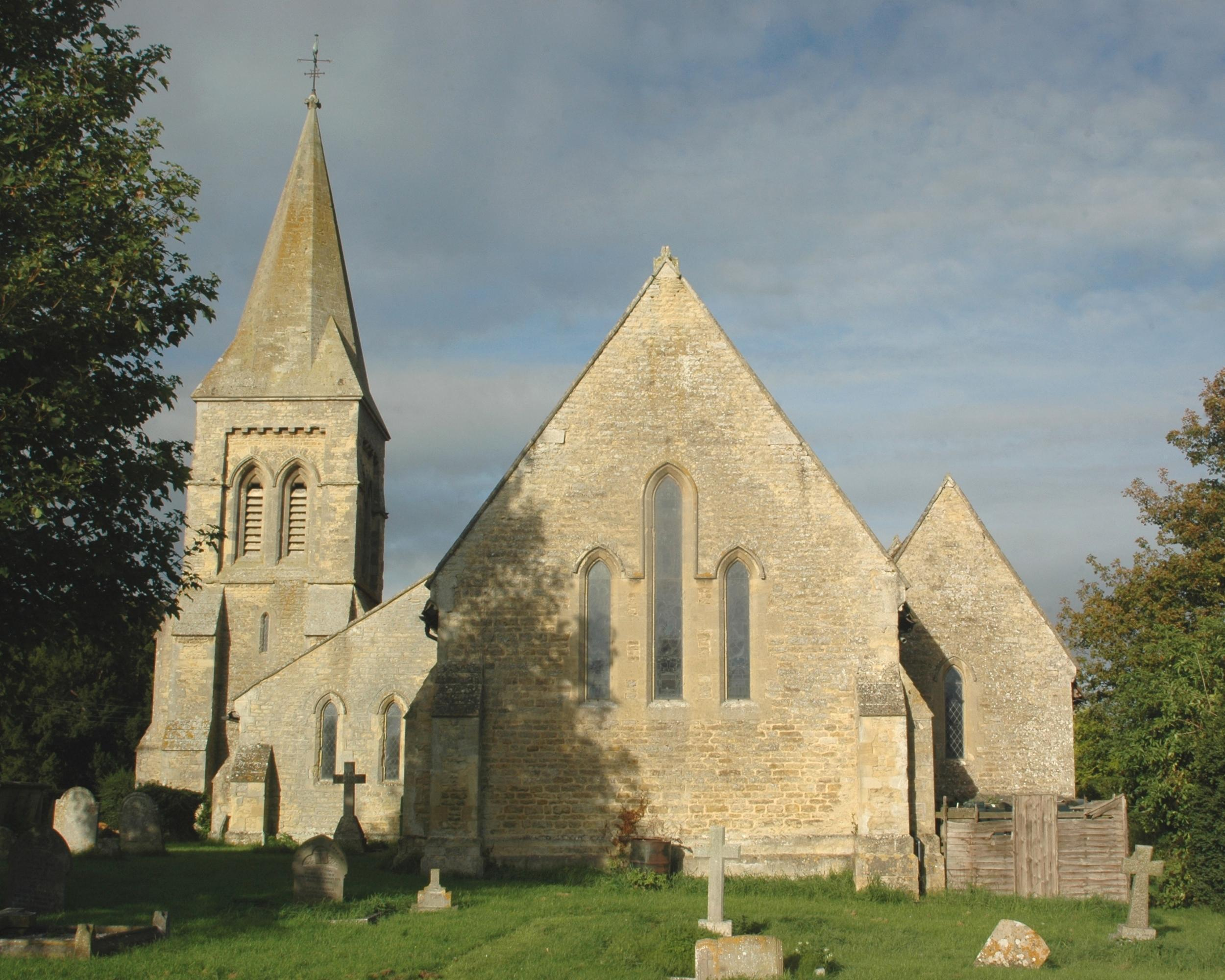
St. Giles' parish church, Tetsworth (1855)

Until at least 1854, Billing practiced in Reading, Berkshire, where he was Borough Surveyor. Billing addressed a meeting of the 1849–50 session of the Oxford Architectural Society on the subject of "Parsonage Houses".

Billing had moved his practice to London by 1856, in which year he was made a Fellow of the Royal Institute of British Architects. Philip Webb (1831–1915) was a pupil of his.

== Works ==
- Christ Church Cathedral, Oxford: repairs, 1853–56
- St. Giles' parish church, Tetsworth, Oxfordshire, 1855
- St. Mary's parish church, Sydenham, Oxfordshire: restoration, 1856
- St. Leonard's parish church, Seaford, East Sussex: transepts and apse, 1861–62
- St. Katherine & St. Leonard's Rectory, Drayton St. Leonard, Oxfordshire, 1862

== Sources ==
- Brodie, Antonia; Felstead, Alison; Franklin, Jonathan; Pinfield, Leslie; Oldfield, Jane, eds. (2001). Directory of British Architects 1834–1914, A–K. London & New York: Continuum. p. 180. ISBN 0-8264-5513-1.
- Colvin, H.M. (1997). A Biographical Dictionary of British Architects, 1600–1840. New Haven: Yale University Press. pp. 123–124. ISBN 0-300-07207-4.
- Nairn, Ian; Pevsner, Nikolaus (1965). Sussex. The Buildings of England. Harmondsworth: Penguin Books. p. 603. ISBN 0-14-071028-0.
- Sherwood, Jennifer; Pevsner, Nikolaus (1974). Oxfordshire. The Buildings of England. Harmondsworth: Penguin Books. pp. 115, 588, 801, 805. ISBN 0-14-071045-0.
- Tyack, Geoffrey (1998). Oxford An Architectural Guide. Oxford & New York: Oxford University Press. p. 225. ISBN 0-19-817423-3.
