= William Crathern =

William Crathern (14 February 1793 – 1861) was an organist and composer of sacred and secular music.

He was baptised on 10 March 1793 at St Leonard's, Shoreditch, the son of Thomas Anthony Crathern and his wife Martha.

He was organist at St Paul's Church, Deptford, and later served at St Magnus the Martyr in London, before taking up the post of organist of St Mary's Chapel, Hammersmith. St Mary's Chapel was a Church of England chapel, built in 1814, which became a parish church in its own right in 1836. The old church, on the corner of what is now Hammersmith Road and Edith Road, London W14, was destroyed by bombs on 16 July 1944. A new church on the same site was consecrated in 1961 and it is now known as St Mary, West Kensington.

His best known secular composition was the song My Boat is On the Shore, a setting of a poem by Lord Byron for piano and voice. The words of My Boat is On the Shore are from the poem entitled “To Thomas More”, written by Byron in 1817. This was one of the earliest musical settings of Byron's work, and is estimated in the British Library catalogue to have been published in about 1820 (although there is no date on the publication itself).

Crathern's principal religious compositions, including chants and anthems, were collected in his volume of Sacred Music, which was certainly published in 1820.

In 1820, Crathern was 27 years old, and he is already described (as he is on the undated song My Boat is On the Shore) as “Organist of St Mary’s Chapel, Hammersmith”.

His setting of I was glad was published by Robert Cocks and Co. in London.

Carl Czerny's Twenty Short Voluntaries opus 698, for organ, were dedicated to Crathern. This was because Crathern was "very active within the profession... quite possibly using Czerny’s methods".

At the 1851 census, when Crathern was about 58 years old, he was a professor of Music and was living at 4 Serampore Terrace, Hammersmith, with his wife Sarah (born Endersby) and an unmarried daughter (Sarah Emma Crathern), aged 37, who was also a Teacher of Music, and one servant Mary Endersby, his Sister-in-Law . There had also been a son, named Thomas Anthony Crathern after his grandfather, but he had died at the age of 28 on 5 November 1847 at the family home in Serampore Terrace.

William Crathern's death was registered in the Kensington district in 1861.
