= Kidmore End =

Village in Oxfordshire, England

Coordinates: 51.509°N 0.995°W

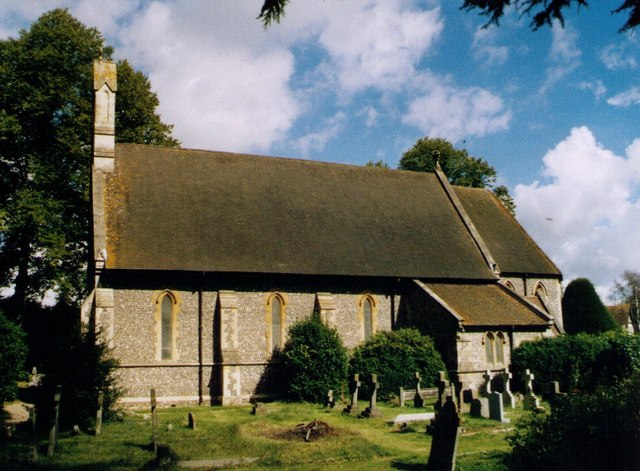
- St John the Baptist parish church

- Location within Oxfordshire
- Area: 10.90 km^{2} (4.21 sq mi)
- Population: 1,302 (parish, including Gallowstree Common) (2011 census)
  - Density: 119/km^{2} (310/sq mi)
- OS grid reference: SU6979
- Civil parish: Kidmore End
- District: South Oxfordshire
- Shire county: Oxfordshire
- Region: South East
- Country: England
- Sovereign state: United Kingdom
- Post town: Reading
- Postcode district: RG4
- Dialling code: 0118
- Police: Thames Valley
- Fire: Oxfordshire
- Ambulance: South Central
- UK Parliament: Henley and Thame
- Website: Kidmore End Parish Council

Kidmore End is a village and civil parish in South Oxfordshire, centred 6 miles (10 km) NNW of Reading, Berkshire, an important regional centre of commerce, research and engineering. It is in the low Chiltern Hills, partly in the Area of Outstanding Natural Beauty. The A4074 from Reading towards Oxford passes through the west of the parish and it is located 6 miles from Henley on Thames.

== Amenities and geography ==
The village is dispersed into four built-up streets or small clusters of homes and has half-timbered cottages, housing ranging from early Georgian to a few late 20th century and early 21st century homes and a public house, the New Inn. The Church of England parish church of Saint John the Baptist, designed by Arthur Billing, was built in 1852. The village school was opened in 1856 and is now a Church of England primary school. Kidmore End Cricket Club plays in the Thames Valley Cricket League. The nearest shop, café and small business services are in Sonning Common, centred 0.5 miles (1 km) north-east. The area is about 3 miles (5 km) long at its longest (north-west to south-east) and includes the named localities of Gallowstree Common by a wooded common, Cane End, Chalkhouse Green and Tokers Green.

== Governance ==
There are three tiers of local government covering Kidmore End, at parish, district and county level: Kidmore End Parish Council, South Oxfordshire District Council and Oxfordshire County Council. The parish council generally meets at the Diamond Jubilee Pavilion at Gallowstree Common Recreation Ground.

=== Administrative history ===
Kidmore End was historically part of the parish of Caversham. Following the completion of St John the Baptist's church at Kidmore End in 1852, an ecclesiastical parish of Kidmore End was created in 1853, covering the northern part of the civil parish of Caversham, the Sonning Common area from the parish of Sonning, and the Shiplake Hill and Shiplake Bottom area from the parish of Shiplake. A civil parish called Kidmore covering the same area as the ecclesiastical parish was created in 1894, and was renamed Kidmore End in 1902 to match the ecclesiastical parish. Sonning Common was made a separate civil parish in 1952.

== Land use ==
The land use statistics published with the 2011 census show that the area was mostly greenspace, which is agriculture and woodland in this area, with the next highest land use category being domestic gardens, followed by roads, non-domestic buildings and domestic buildings.

== Sources ==
- Bendall, Sarah (2000). "Merton College and the Mapping of its Estates, 1601-1836" (PDF). Oxoniensia. 65. Oxfordshire Architectural and Historical Society: 89–110.
- Sherwood, Jennifer; Pevsner, Nikolaus (1974). Oxfordshire. The Buildings of England. Harmondsworth: Penguin Books. pp. 672–673. ISBN 0-14-071045-0.
