= St Martin Outwich =

Former church-site in London

Coordinates: 51°30′51.5″N 0°5′2.5″W

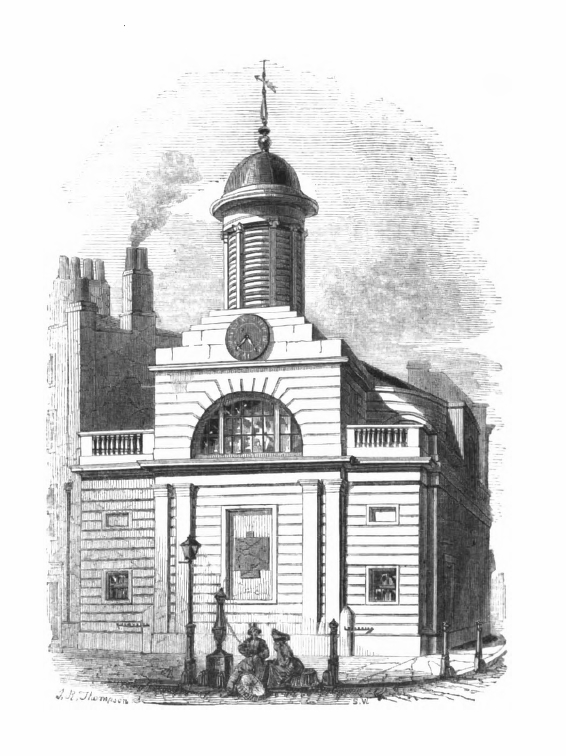
- The church in the early 19th century
- St Martin Outwich
- Denomination: Church of England

Architecture
- Demolished: 1874

Administration
- Diocese: Diocese of London

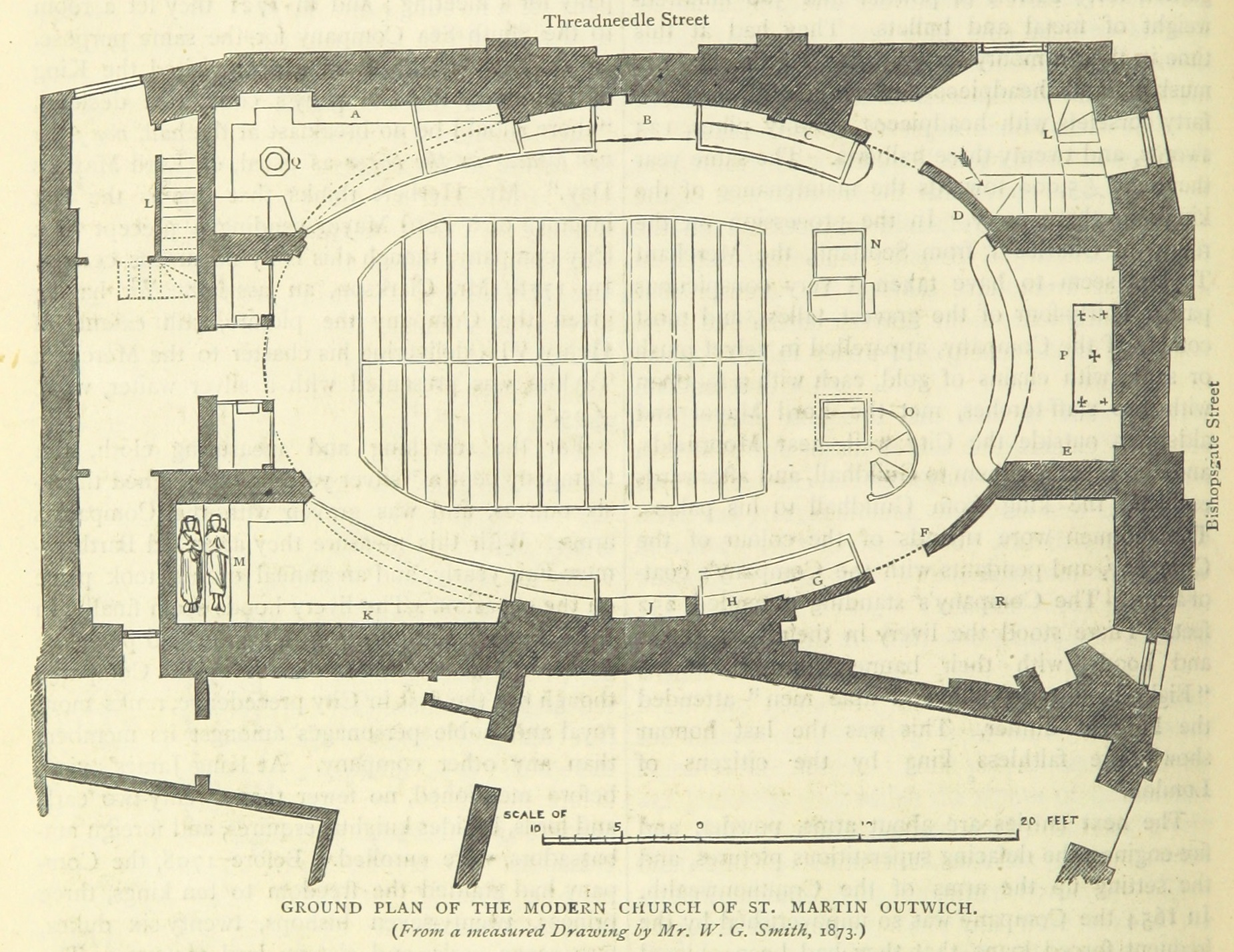
Ground plan of the church, shortly before demolition, showing the oval design of the interior.

St Martin Outwich was a parish church in the City of London, on the corner of Threadneedle Street and Bishopsgate. Of medieval origin, it was rebuilt at the end of the 18th century and demolished in 1874.

== Early history ==
A church of St Martin was built in the 14th century at the expense of members of the Oteswich family, from whom the church derives its name. The church escaped the Great Fire of 1666, but fell into decay, and was badly damaged in a fire of 1765 which destroyed fifty houses. The medieval church had a nave and south aisle, with a western tower.

The patronage was in the hands of the earls of Surrey and then of the Outeswich family, until it was transferred to the Merchant Taylors' Company.

== Rebuilding ==
In 1796 an act of Parliament was obtained to allow the parish to raise money to rebuild the church. The Merchant Taylors gave £500, and the Corporation of the City of London and the South Sea Company gave £200 each towards the total cost of £5, 256. The first stone was laid on 4 May of that year, and the new building, to the designs of Samuel Pepys Cockerell, was consecrated in November 1798. A new organ was provided by George Pike England in 1805.

Cockerell's church was oval in plan, with a recess at the east end forming the chancel. The walls were decorated with pilasters, from the capitals of which rose a coved ceiling, pierced by four semi-circular windows. A fifth window, over the altar, contained stained glass coats-of-arms from the medieval church. Several monuments from the old church were also preserved, including one to John Outeswich and his wife. There was a fresco of the Ascension by John Francis Rigaud over the altar, which had deteriorated badly within ten years of being painted. When the church was first built the pulpit was at the west end, with the pews facing away from the altar. The pulpit was moved to the west end as part of a programme of repairs and alterations by Charles Barry in 1827.

The heavily rusticated east front (illustrated above), facing into Bishopsgate, was described by James Peller Malcolm as "a complete representation of a gaol, accompanied by marks of extreme strength, very ill suited to its diminutive outline." The north side, towards Threadneedle Street, was very plain.

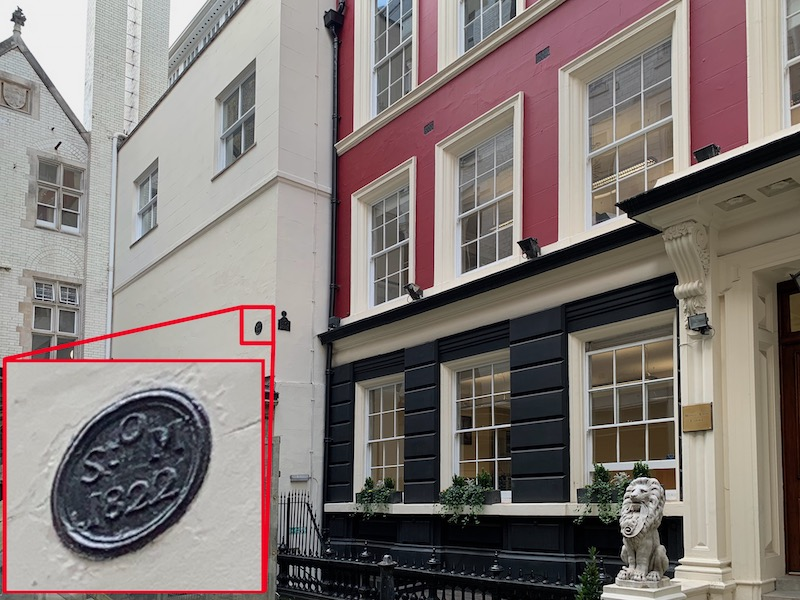
St Martin Outwich parish boundary marker in White Lion Court

== Demolition ==
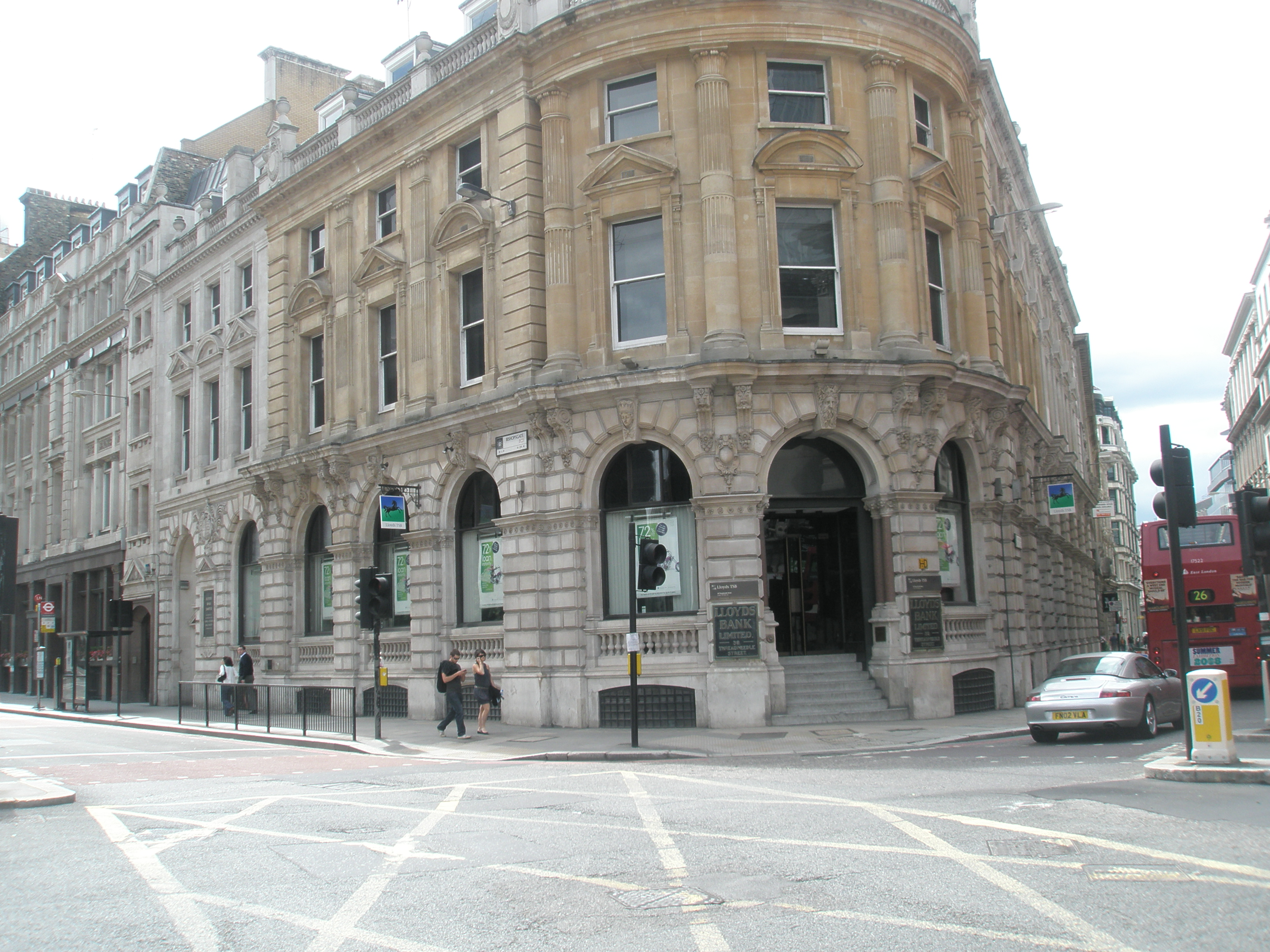
The site today

The church was demolished in 1874 and its parish united with that of St Helen's Church, Bishopsgate. Eighteen monuments were moved into St Helen's before St Martin's was destroyed, while the bell was given to St. Andrew's Church, Fulham. A churchyard in Camomile Street was given to the church in 1540. It survives as a garden in the courtyard of an office block.

Proceeds from the sale of the church were used to fund the construction of Holy Trinity Church, Dalston, designed by Ewan Christian and constructed in 1878–79.
