= Benjamin Ingelow =

English architect

Benjamin Ingelow (17 April 1835 – 1 January 1926) was an English architect who practised from an office in London.

== Biography ==
Ingelow was born in Ipswich, Suffolk, where his father, William Ingelow, was a banker. The poet Jean Ingelow was his older sister.

His training started when he was articled to Arthur Shean Newman (son of architect John Newman) in 1852. He later joined the architectural practice of William Slater, where he was an improver and an assistant. When R. H. Carpenter joined Slater in partnership, Ingelow became the chief assistant. Slater died in 1872, and Ingelow became a partner of Carpenter.

In 1879, Carpenter and Ingelow received the commission to create the topographical crown of Nathaniel Woodard's schools — Ellesmere College in Cheshire, with its "H" plan and gothic facade looking out over a quadrangle, terraces and playing fields towards the hills of Wales.

Following Carpenter's death in 1893, Ingelow continued the practice on his own until he died in 1925. Ingelow's more notable works were carried out in conjunction with Carpenter, and besides Ellesmere College includes the Chapel at the School of St Mary and St Ann, Abbots Bromley, which is listed at Grade II.
