= Charles Feret =

British newspaper editor and writer

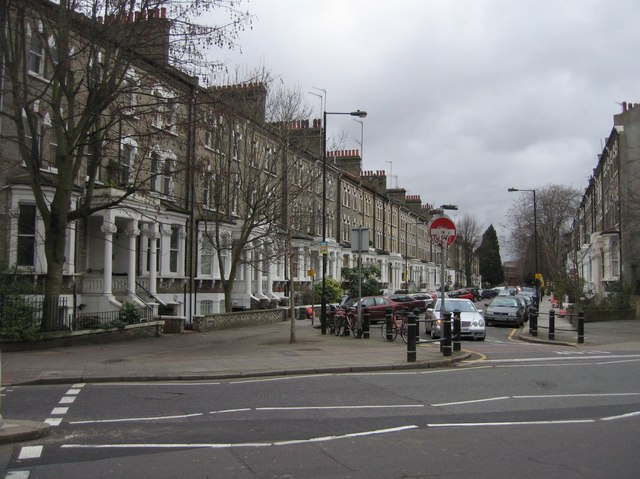
Edith Road, 'West Kensington', where the Féret family lived at no. 49 (bombed during The Blitz and replaced by flats)

Charles James Feret (bapt. James Charles Féret; 19 December 1854 – 13 March 1921) was a British newspaper editor and writer. He is known among historians of London as the author of an exhaustive three volume history of Fulham, published in 1900.

Feret was born in Clerkenwell, London, to Louis Joseph Philibert Féret, a haberdasher from Paris, and Mary Coker. He had an elder sister, Cordelia. During his childhood, the family moved west to Earl's Court. After school, he joined the civil service and worked as a clerk in the India Office. He was of a studious disposition and by 21, he had a British Museum Library reader's ticket.

While still at the India Office, and having moved to Fulham with his mother and sister some years earlier, he took up the part-time post of editor at the local paper, The Fulham Chronicle, which launched in 1888. His thousand-page illustrated, Fulham Old and New, was well supported and was published by subscription by the Leadenhall Press in 1900. In 1901, he not only left The Chronicle, but moved to Margate probably for better quality air and became an antique dealer. He never married, but adopted a young girl from an orphanage. After her death, he adopted a second daughter. He died in Margate of a heart attack.
