= Tokers Green =

Hamlet in Oxfordshire, England

Coordinates: 51.491°N 0.993°W

- Location within Oxfordshire
- OS grid reference: SU6977
- Civil parish: Kidmore End
- District: South Oxfordshire
- Shire county: Oxfordshire
- Region: South East
- Country: England
- Sovereign state: United Kingdom
- Post town: Reading
- Postcode district: RG4
- Dialling code: 0118
- Police: Thames Valley
- Fire: Oxfordshire
- Ambulance: South Central
- UK Parliament: Henley and Thame
- Website: Kidmore End Parish Council

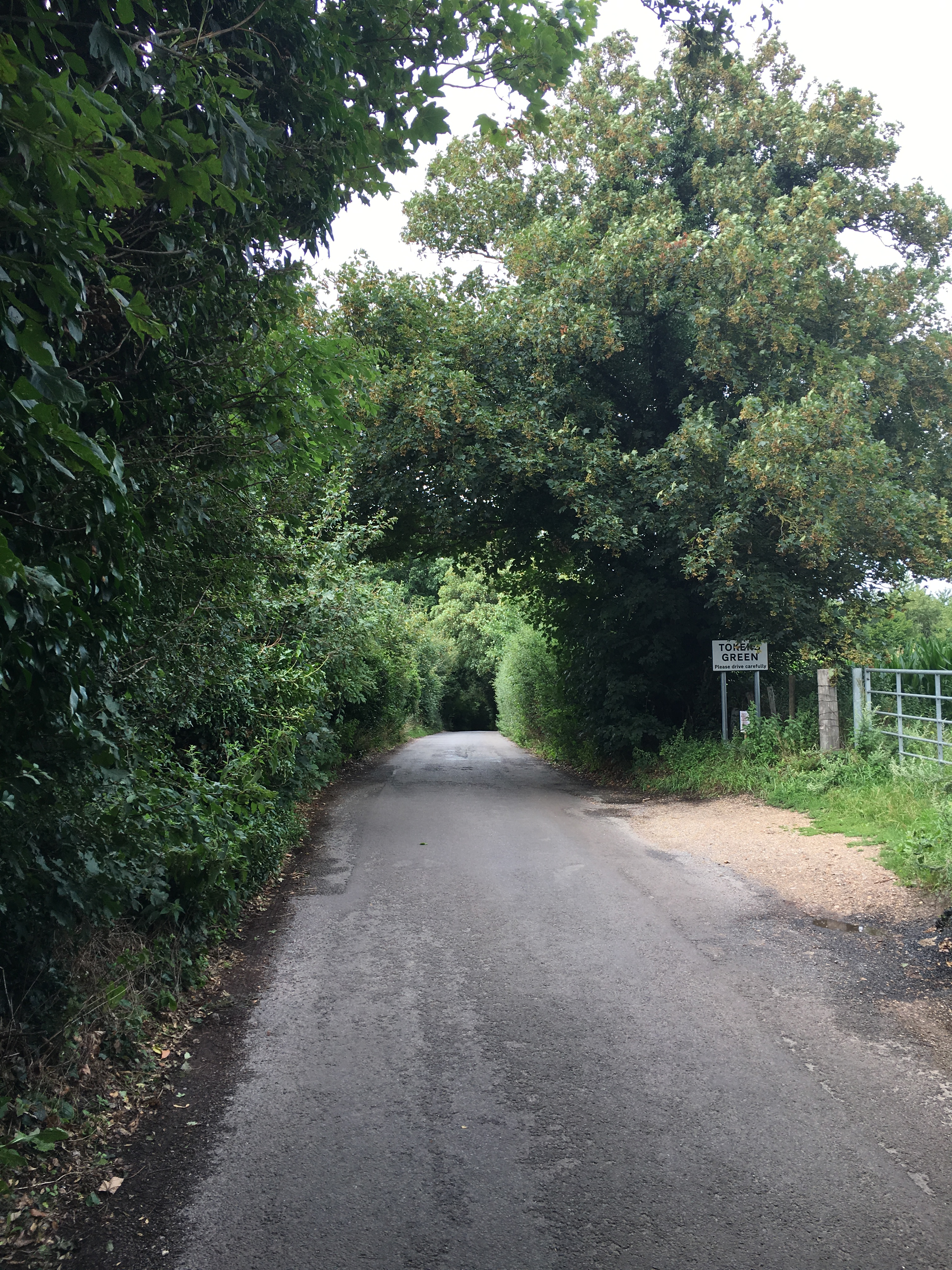
Tokers Green, Oxfordshire

Tokers Green is a hamlet in South Oxfordshire, England, about 4 miles (6.4 km) north of Reading, Berkshire. Its village neighbours are Chazey Heath and Kidmore End. Tokers Green is a village of houses apart from a farm. It stretches on two roads, Tokers Green Lane and Rokeby Drive.
