= Gallowstree Common =

Village near Reading, England

Coordinates: 51.516°N 1.006°W

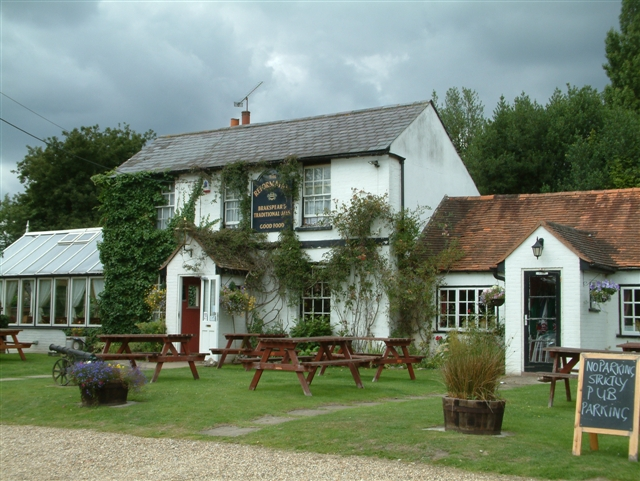
- The Reformation Public House

- Location within Oxfordshire
- OS grid reference: SU6980
- Civil parish: Kidmore End
- District: South Oxfordshire
- Shire county: Oxfordshire
- Region: South East
- Country: England
- Sovereign state: United Kingdom
- Post town: Reading
- Postcode district: RG4
- Dialling code: 0118
- Police: Thames Valley
- Fire: Oxfordshire
- Ambulance: South Central
- UK Parliament: Henley
- Website: Kidmore End Parish Council

Gallowstree Common is a hamlet in South Oxfordshire, England, about 4.5 miles (7.2 km) north of Reading, Berkshire.

The village had a public house, the Reformation, which was controlled by the Brakspear brewery. In 2023, the brewery sold the pub garden for housing and the pub is to be turned into a veterinary surgery. Antony Worrall Thompson was chef at an earlier public house in the village, the Greyhound, which closed in 2009. In 2011, a Diamond Jubilee Pavilion was constructed at a recreation ground in the hamlet at a cost of £590,000; it hosts Kidmore End Cricket Club.

The village has two woods: New Copse and Withy Copse.

== See also ==
Media related to Gallowstree Common at Wikimedia Commons

- List of places in Oxfordshire
