= The Fulham Boys School =

Church of England free school in West Kensington, London

Location
- 560 Fulham Road, Fulham, London, SW6 5PY; Fulham, London, SW6 5PY; England; 51.479353°N 0.199681°W

Information
- Type: Free school
- Religious affiliation: Church of England
- Established: 2014
- Founder: Alex Wade
- Department for Education URN: 141135 Tables
- Ofsted: Reports
- Headmaster: David Smith
- Chaplain: Sam Brown
- Gender: Boys
- Age: 11 to 18
- Houses: Brunel (Red), Dickens (Blue), Liddell (Yellow), Wilberforce (Purple)
- Colours: Red, Blue
- Sports: Rugby, Football, Cricket, Rowing
- Newspaper: FBS Voice
- Website: http://www.fulhamboysschool.org

The Fulham Boys School is an English Church of England free school for boys aged 11 to 18. It was founded by a group of Fulham inhabitants and opened in September 2014. Its initial temporary location was in West Kensington in London however there was a second temporary site at Beaumont Avenue. The permanent site is on the premises of the former Fulham Police Station by Fulham Road.

The Fulham Boys School offers an education specifically geared towards boys. Its website states: "Through the application of our Christian values, mutual respect, supportive pastoral care and inspirational teaching, we will help every boy to find his unique talent and realise it, for the benefit of all."

The head teacher who joined in 2018 is David Smith who previously graduated with a degree in Theology from King's College London

Although it is a Church of England school, 50% of the places are offered to boys of all faiths and none.

== Admission ==
Up to eight boys may be admitted on the basis of their sporting aptitude.

== In Media ==
The Fulham Boys School's students, staff, and alumni have been consistently featured in the YouTube channel Korean Englishman showing them try various Korean cuisines such as school lunches, and eventually having a series where students were taken on a school trip to South Korea.
