= Harry Hems =

English sculptor

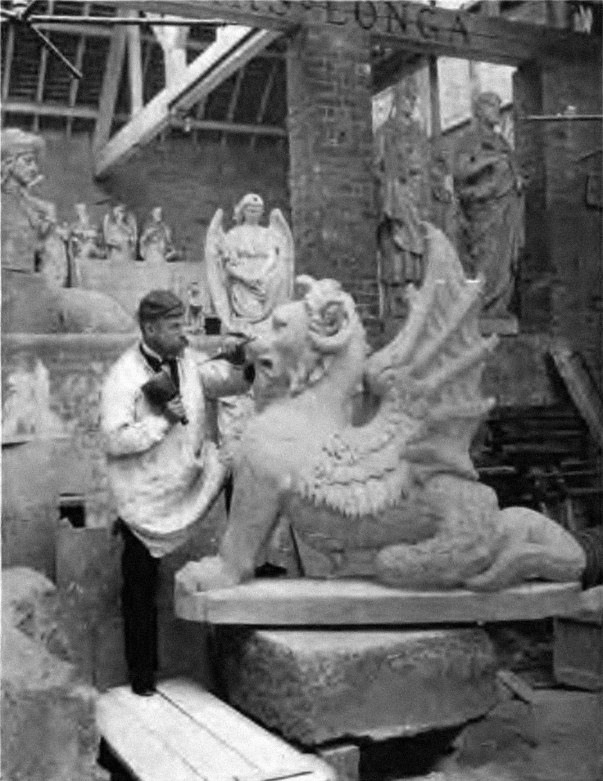
Hems at work in his studio in 1896

Harry Hems (12 June 1842 – 5 January 1916) was an English architectural and ecclesiastical sculptor who was particularly inspired by Gothic architecture and a practitioner of Gothic Revival. He founded and ran a large workshop in Exeter, Devon, which produced woodwork and sculpture for churches all over the country and abroad. He was also a philanthropist and an eager self-promoter. A large part of the collection of medieval woodwork that he accumulated during his working life is now in the Royal Albert Memorial Museum in Exeter.

== Biography ==
Born in Islington, London, the son of Henry Hems, an ironmonger and cutler, Harry Hems started work as a cutler before taking at age fourteen a seven-year apprenticeship as a woodcarver in Sheffield. Returning to London, he found employment in the construction of the Foreign Office building and the Langham Hotel. He then spent two years seeking inspiration in Italy, but was supposedly arrested as a spy and had to return to England penniless. On his return, however, he soon found work on the building of the Royal Albert Memorial Museum, in Exeter, Devon. When he arrived in Exeter on 4 December 1866 by train he said that he found a horseshoe on his way from the railway station, and kept it as a lucky charm.

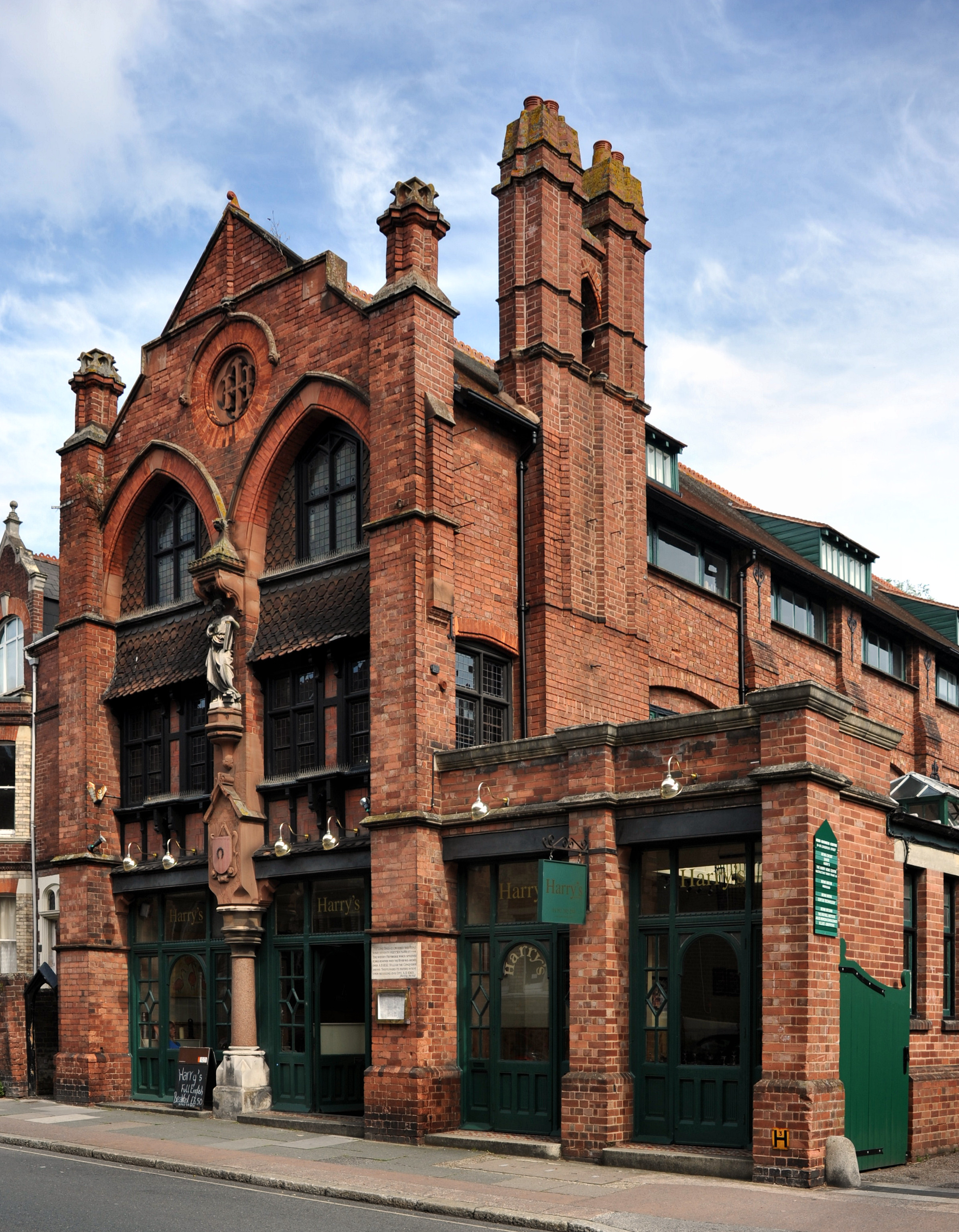
Hems's "Ye Luckie Horseshoe Studio", Longbrook Street, Exeter

Hems married Charlotte Presswell Turner at Littleham, Exmouth in 1868, and settled in Exeter. He started a company there that specialised in ecclesiastical sculpture and church fittings, and named it "The Ecclesiastical Art Works". It benefited from the widespread restoration of churches that was taking place at the time: by 1879 more than 400 churches and 100 public buildings contained work that had been created by the company. The 1881 census recorded that he was employing 23 men and 7 boys, and because of the need for more space he commissioned the building of a new workshop on a two-acre plot at 84 Longbrook Street, Exeter. The architect was Robert Medley Fulford who had already worked with Hems on several ecclesiastical designs.

The style of his new brick-built workshop has been described variously as "'domesticated' or modified Queen Anne Flemish", a "freely-treated Jacobean character", and "gothic styled but with several peculiar additions". Nikolaus Pevsner called it "fanciful". It opened in 1883 and was extended the following year. Hems named it "Ye Luckie Horseshoe Studio". It extends over three floors and has a circular window in the gable facing the road that incorporates Hems's monogram. At the company's peak, after 1895, Hems employed over a hundred craftsmen, and also had staff in London, Oxford and Ireland. He lived next door to his workshop in a house, "Fair Park", with a prominent corner turret.

Hems died on 5 January 1916, his wife having died the previous June. He is buried in Exeter's Upper Cemetery, his grave marked by a tombstone bearing a finely carved crucifixion. He was survived by seven children; a son whom he christened Lord Archibald died young.

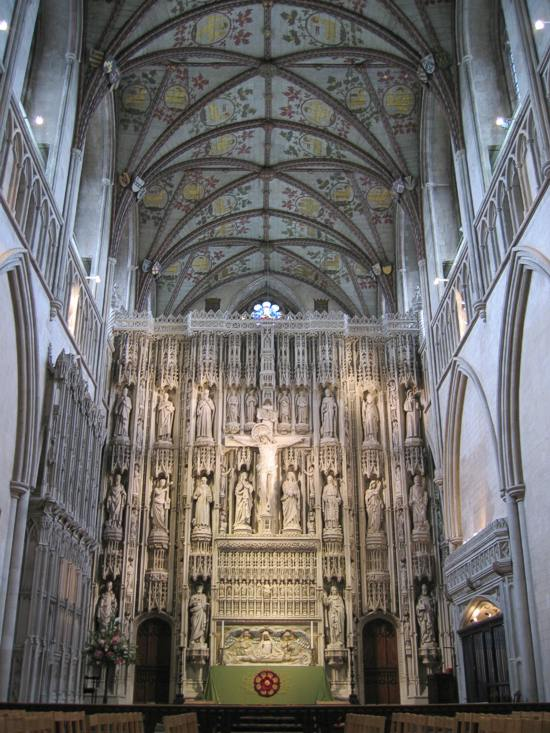
The screen at St Alban's Cathedral, restored by Hems

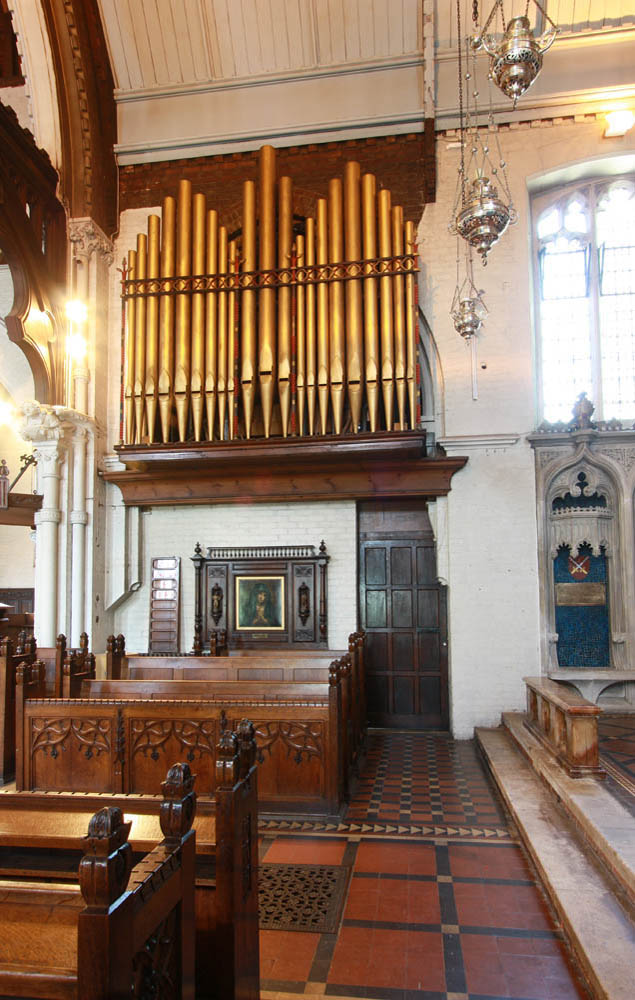
The choir stalls in front of the organ at St. Andrew's Church, Fulham, London, were made by Hems

== Works ==
Hems was commissioned to produce work for many churches and several cathedrals throughout England, and in America and Australia. His work won medals at the Centennial International Exhibition in Philadelphia (1876), was exhibited at the Paris Exposition Universelle (1878) and also won prizes at exhibitions in Chicago (1893) and Antwerp (1894). Examples in Devon of notable work from Hems's workshop are the rood screen restorations in the churches at Littleham, Staverton and Kenn; the fittings at Winkleigh and Revelstoke; and the alabaster reredoses at Swimbridge and St Paul, Honiton.

The firm contributed a reredos and choir stalls to the 1887–9 restoration of St Denys' Church, Warminster, Wiltshire, part of what Historic England describe as "an exceptional ensemble"; the pulpit with inlaid marble is also his. In Bristol, he completed the statues for the replacement of the Bristol High Cross in 1889. Probably his most notable work was the restoration of the large medieval screen at St Alban's Cathedral, Hertfordshire, which was dedicated on 1 November 1899, and the construction of a similar screen in Christ Church Cathedral in St. Louis, Missouri, USA.

Apart from his work as a sculptor, Hems was keen on travel and was a prolific writer, claiming "to have written more signed articles upon architecture, travel and other subjects than any other man". He was also a benefactor of the poor—amongst other charitable work, for many years he held Christmas lunches in his workshop for the elderly poor people of Exeter, inviting as many each year as his age. He helped found the Exeter Dental Hospital; supported the Devon and Exeter Hospital; was a pioneer of the Hospital Saturday Movement (a national weekly collection scheme in aid of local hospitals); and supported the Rifle Volunteer force. In addition he was churchwarden at St Sidwell's church and was a city councillor for a period.

== Personality ==
Hems was a hard worker – a report of 1879 said that "he is 'always at it' from six in the morning until nine at night, and often much later", and he expected the same level of commitment from his workforce, apparently resorting to violence against them if they would not comply. In October 1878 he was charged £1 plus costs for fighting with one of his employees, and the following year a court was told that he had said that he would "break [William Mears] in as he had several of his other apprentices".

"I happen to possess over 33,000 press notices of myself, all bound up and indexed, and anyone of them ready to be turned to at any moment (extending from January 31st 1868, down to five of today's date, added thereto this morning.)"

— letter written by Hems on 22 May 1909.

He was also reportedly a flamboyant and extroverted self-promoter, taking advantage of any marketing opportunities that arose. He has at least two well-known disputes with the Tax Commissioners. In September 1888 an auction of his goods on account of unpaid taxes took place at his workshop in which one of the lots was a life-sized statue of St Matthew the Taxgatherer.

After he again refused to pay the assessed amount of tax in 1907, another auction of his goods was arranged. It took place on 29 April that year, and he prepared the auction catalogue himself. The sale items included the crowbar that had been used by the bailiffs to gain entry to his workshop, a set of old stocks ("offering accommodation for three malefactors"), three "second-hand tombstones (slightly damaged) ... suitable for the graves of Income Tax Commissioners or other Revenue Officials", and his bulldog named Bob. According to his 1917 obituary, a sculpture of the Twelve Apostles was also included, and the event was widely reported at the time, with Hems making much of the way that he had made the Twelve Apostles pay his income tax.

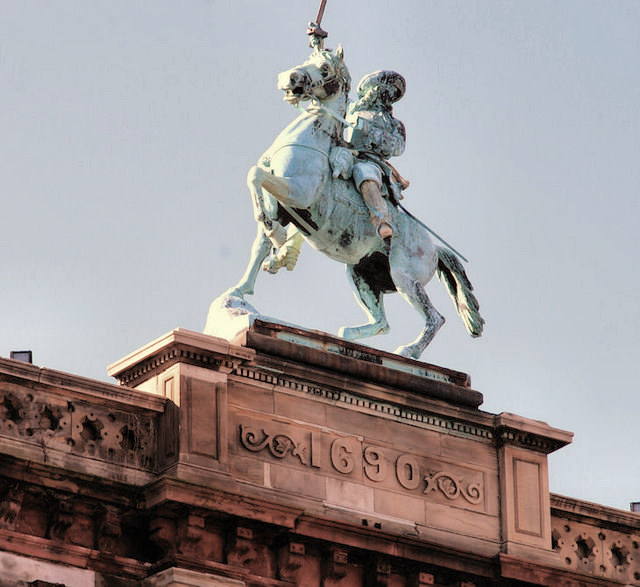
Bronze of King William III, at Clifton Street Orange Hall, Belfast by Harry Hems

Hems was also a prolific contributor to newspapers, and journals such as Notes and Queries, and he retained cuttings of everything published that referred to him, in a series of at least 15 volumes of 400 pages each.

== Legacy ==
Apart from the large quantity of sculpture produced by his company, some of which is detailed above and which also includes the large bronze statue of William III on Clifton Street Orange Hall in Belfast, unveiled in 1889; and a memorial to R. D. Blackmore in Exeter Cathedral, Hems has left two notable legacies: a collection of medieval woodcarving, and his workshop.

During his working life Hems salvaged many pieces of medieval woodcarving, mainly from churches in South West England, and he displayed them in rows around his workshop as inspiration for his craftsmen. After his death, Exeter's Royal Albert Memorial Museum purchased nearly 500 of these carvings. The collection includes many roof bosses, bench ends etc., a number of misericords, and a Green Man sculpture, and is described on the museum's website as one of the most important collections of medieval woodwork in a British museum.

After Hems's death, his business was carried on by two of his four sons, Wilfred (1885-1941) and Harry T. (1873-1952). For some years the company continued to flourish: it built many war memorials after the First World War, and in 1921 it was commissioned by the Canadian Government to create a speaker's chair for the House of Commons chamber in Ottawa, and a duplicate for the Australian Government in 1926. When Wilfred and Harry T. retired in 1938, the workshop building was sold and Hems's personal effects were auctioned. The building was bought and used until the 1970s by a boot, shoe and leather merchants; then a wine merchant; and following refurbishment it is now known as "The Harry Hems Centre", housing a restaurant, conference facility and other businesses. It still displays Hems's "luckie horseshoe" above the main entrance.

== See also ==
- John Angel (sculptor) who may have apprenticed with him.
