= Gwendwr Gardens =

Park in the United Kingdom

Coordinates: 51.4914°N 0.2087°W

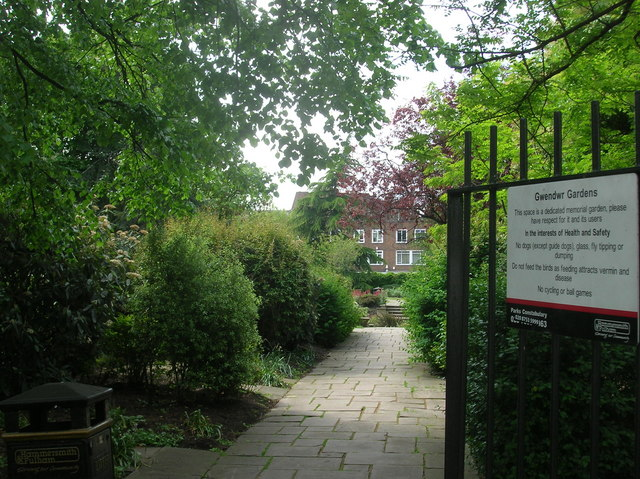
Gwendwr Gardens, Gwendwr Road

Gwendwr Gardens is a small park in West Kensington, West London. In 1948, a plot of land was donated to the Metropolitan Borough of Fulham by the Gunter estate for a memorial to the victims of German air raids in the area, particularly the Operation Steinbock raid on the night of 20 February 1944.

The park contains a sunken area with a pond, lawns and a commemorative plaque.
