= Arthur Billing =

British architect

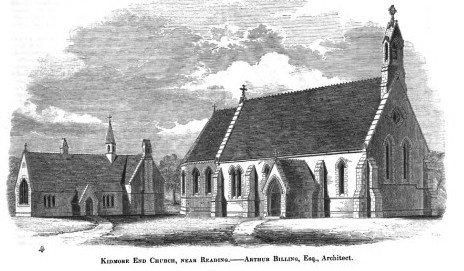
- St John the Baptist, Kidmore End, Oxfordshire (1851–52), designed by Arthur Billing
- Born: 28 January 1824; Reading, Berkshire
- Died: 13 April 1896 (aged 72); 5 Peterboro-villas, Kings-road, Fulham, Middlesex
- Occupation: Architect

Arthur Billing FRIBA (1824–1896), was a British architect.

Arthur Billing was born in Reading, Berkshire in 1824 and educated at Reading School. He was the son of Richard Billing (1784–1853) and the brother of Richard (1814–1884) and John Billing (1817–1863), all surveyors and architects. He married in 1855 and died on 13 April 1896 in Fulham.

Billing worked in the office of the well-known Gothic Revival architect, Benjamin Ferrey, in London from 1847 and commenced independent practice in 1849, his office being at 4 Beaufort-buildings on The Strand and then at 10 Buckingham Street, Adelphi. In 1851 he read a paper "On mural painting and the decorations of churches generally", mainly historical but ending with a plea for the increased use of painted decoration. He worked in partnership with Arthur Shean Newman (1828–1873) as Newman & Billing at 185 Tooley Street, Southwark from 1860 until Newman's death, when he took on Newman's son, Arthur Harrison Newman (1855–1922), as his apprentice.

Both on his own and in partnership he built and restored mainly churches in London and the south of England. An early commission, designed in Early English style with simple lancet windows, was the church of St John the Baptist, Kidmore End, Oxfordshire, close to Billing's home town of Reading. In 1868 he was commissioned to design the English Church in Meiringen, an Alpine resort in Switzerland, and he designed St Luke's Church, Hackney (1871-2) with Newman. However, he also designed warehouses on the River Thames and the four-storey Westbourne Hall (1860–61) with a facade decorated with theatrical busts as an extension to the Bayswater Athenaeum at 26 Westbourne Grove. He served as Surveyor to Guy's Hospital and, until 1884, to St Olave's (Southwark) District Board of Works.

In 1890 he took his son Arthur Ernest Billing (1857–1920) into partnership; they were joined by Joseph William Rowley in 1893, the practice title then becoming Arthur Billing Son & Rowley. Billing retired in 1894.
