= Fulham & Hammersmith Chronicle =

London newspaper (1888–present)

The Fulham & Hammersmith Chronicle newspaper (formerly the Fulham Chronicle) started life on 6 April 1888, produced at an office in Walham Green, Fulham. The first edition stated that the newspaper was set up "to supply the need which is felt in this district for a genuinely local journal." One of its first part-time editors, was Charles James Feret, who later became known as the "Historian of Fulham".

== First edition ==
The newspaper cost readers one halfpenny, earning the Chronicle the nickname Ha'penny Hot'un. Stories from the first edition included "Accident in Dawes Road", which told of a nasty accident between a young boy delivering milk and a ginger beer van at a "dangerous corner" of Dawes Road, in Fulham. The title also contained several chapters from a fiction novel entitled The Hillyars and the Burtons: A story of two families, by Henry Kingsley.

== Centenary edition ==
Over the years, the stories and the format have slowly changed. For the 100th anniversary, the Fulham Chronicle ran a special supplement on 7 April 1988, reminding readers of major news stories which had taken place since the launch of the newspaper.

Chronicle reporters have covered the major celebrations in Fulham on Queen Victoria's Diamond Jubilee in 1897, the "devastation and horror" on the streets of Fulham during the Second World War and the history of Fulham Football Club at Craven Cottage.

The centenary edition of the paper featured a message from Queen Elizabeth II, which read: "I was very pleased to receive your kind message of loyal greetings, send on the occasion of the paper's centenary. "I send you, the staff and readers of the Fulham Chronicle, my warm congratulations on this notable anniversary, together with my best wishes for the future."

== The 21st century ==
A major change to the newspaper was made in 2000, when the title was extended to the Fulham and Hammersmith Chronicle, and in September 2008, a website was launched.

Then in January 2010 the Fulham and Hammersmith Chronicle turned from a paid-for newspaper to a free paper with an increased distribution of 72,000, taking the paper's household penetration in the Hammersmith and Fulham borough from just over 20 per cent to nearly 99 per cent.

A new, updated website www.fulhamchronicle.co.uk was also launched when the newspaper turned free.

== Ownership ==
The Fulham and Hammersmith Chronicle is owned by Trinity Mirror plc which also publishes the Daily Mirror.
