= West Kensington tube station =

London Underground station

West Kensington
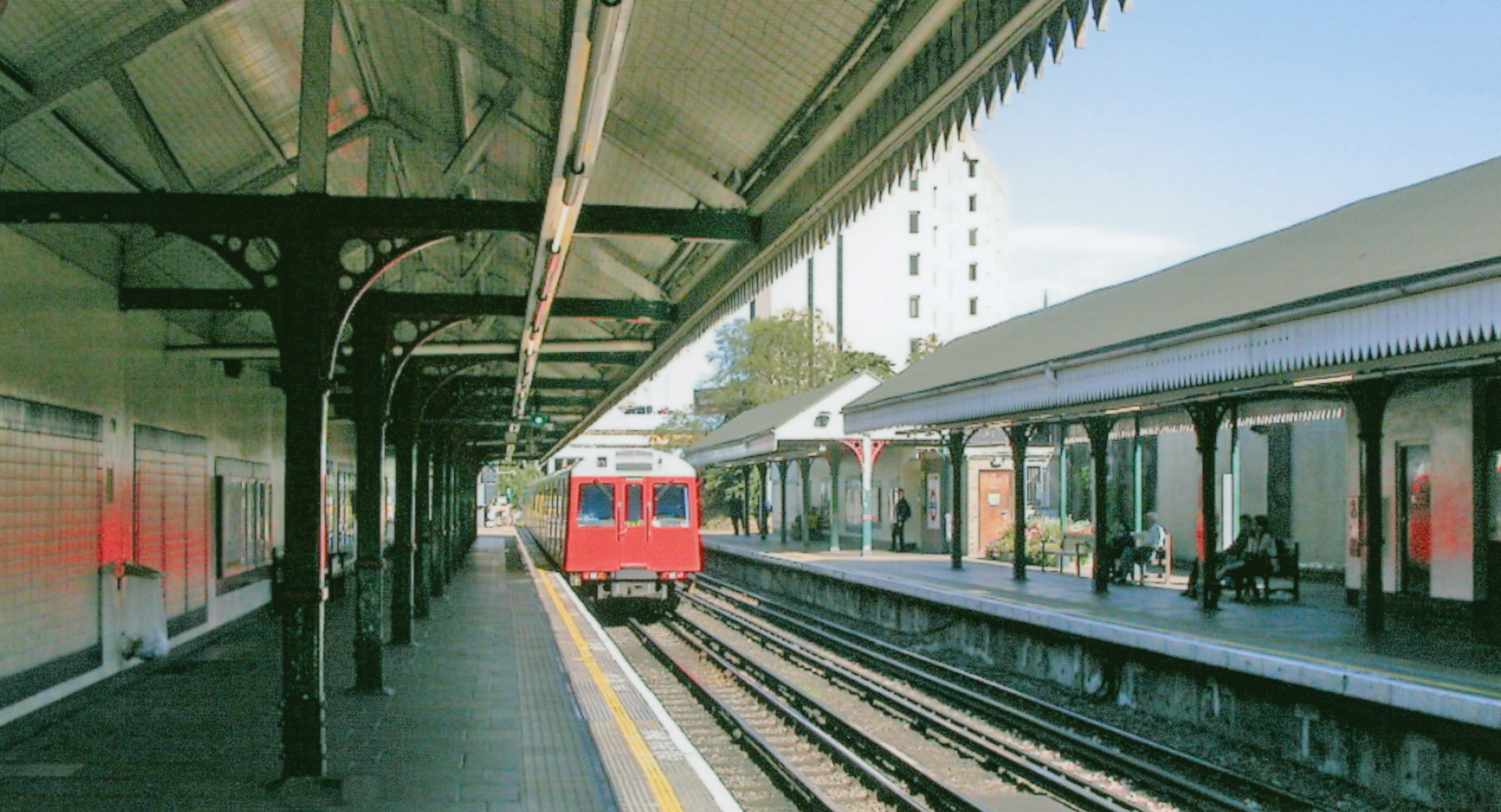
- District line eastbound platform at the station
- Interactive map of West Kensington

General information
- Location: West Kensington
- Local authority: London Borough of Hammersmith and Fulham
- Managed by: London Underground
- Number of platforms: 2
- Fare zone: 2

London Underground annual entry and exit
- 2020: ▼2.10 million
- 2021: ▼2.03 million
- 2022: ▲3.61 million
- 2023: ▲3.76 million
- 2024: ▲3.99 million

Key dates
- 9 September 1874: Opened (DR)
- 5 May 1878: Started "Super Outer Circle" (Midland)
- 30 September 1880: Ended "Super Outer Circle"
- 14 July 1965: Goods yard closed

Other information
- External links: TfL station info page
- Coordinates: 51.4908°N 0.2063°W

West Kensington is a London Underground station in West Kensington, London. It is located on North End Road (B317) close to its junction with West Cromwell Road/Talgarth Road (A4). The station is on the District line, between Barons Court and Earl's Court stations. It is in London fare zone 2.

The station is situated in a cutting with the ticket office at street level.

== History ==
The station was opened by the District Railway (DR, now the District line) on 9 September 1874 as 'North End (Fulham)' when it opened its extension from Earl's Court to Hammersmith. At that time the next station west was Hammersmith - Barons Court did not open until 1905. It was renamed West Kensington in 1877. Despite its name, the station is located in Hammersmith and Fulham.

On 5 May 1878, The Midland Railway began running a circuitous service known as the "Super Outer Circle" from St Pancras to Earl's Court via Cricklewood and South Acton. It operated over a now disused connection between the NLR and the London and South Western Railway's branch to Richmond (now part of the District line). The service was not a success and was ended on 30 September 1880.

The entrance building was rebuilt in 1927. The design, by Charles Holden, uses similar materials and finishes to those Holden used for the Northern line's Morden extension opened in 1926.

In 2009, because of financial constraints, TfL decided to stop work on a project to provide step-free access at West Kensington and five other stations, on the grounds that these are relatively quiet stations and some are already one or two stops away from an existing step-free station. Earl's Court and Hammersmith stations which have step-free access are respectively one stop to the east and two stops to the west. £5.05 million was spent on West Kensington before the project was halted.

== Services ==
West Kensington station is on the District line in London fare zone 2. It is between Barons Court to the west and Earl's Court to the east. The typical off-peak service pattern in trains per hour is:

- 6 tph to Ealing Broadway
- 6 tph to Richmond
- 12 tph to Upminster.

== Connections ==
The station is also served by London Buses day and nightime routes.

Preceding station	London Underground	Following station
Barons Court towards Ealing Broadway or Richmond	District line	Earl's Court towards Upminster, High Street Kensington or Edgware Road
Former service
Hammersmith towards St Pancras	Midland Railway (1878–1880)	Earl's Court Terminus
