= John Newman (architect) =

English architect and antiquarian

John Newman (1786–1859) was an English architect, known also as an antiquarian.

== Life ==
The son of John Newman (of the same name), a wholesale dealer in leather in Skinner Street, Snow Hill, London, and a common councillor of the ward of Farringdon Without, he was baptised at the church of St Sepulchre-without-Newgate, on 8 July 1786. Newman was employed under Sir Robert Smirke in the erection of Covent Garden Theatre in 1809, and on the London General Post Office between 1823 and 1829.

From approximately 1815, Newman was one of the three surveyors in the commission of sewers for Kent and Surrey, and with the other surveyors, Joseph Gwilt and Edward I'Anson, published a Report relating to the Sewage in 1843. He was for many years in the office of the Bridge House Estates, and eventually succeeded to the clerkship. He held several surveying appointments, including that to the commissioners of pavements and improvements for the west division of Southwark, and to Earl Somers' estate in Somers Town, London. He was honorary architect to the Royal Literary Fund from 1846, and to the Society of Patrons of the Charity Children's Anniversary Meeting in St Paul's Cathedral.

Newman retired in 1851. He died at the house of his son-in-law Alexander Spiers, at Passy near Paris, on 3 January 1859.

== Architectural works ==
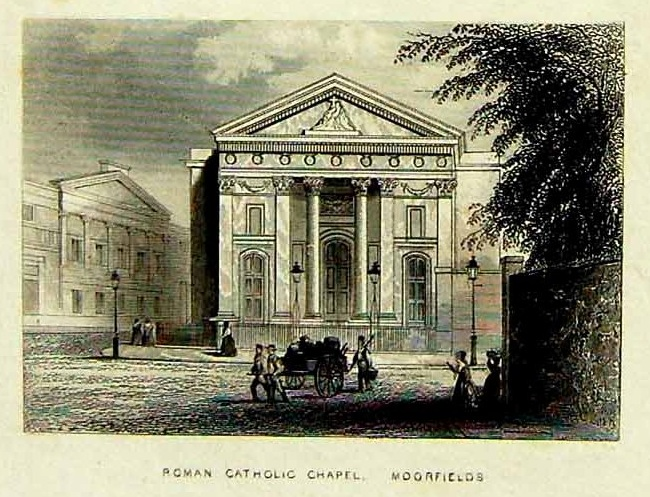
St Mary Moorfields, designed by Newman in 1820 (print 1852)

Newman designed:

- Roman Catholic church of St Mary, Blomfield Street, Moorfields, in 1817–20, which was used as the pro-cathedral of the Roman Catholic Archdiocese of Westminster until 2 July 1869;
- houses in Duke Street, London Bridge, with wharves and warehouses, constructed when the line for the new bridge was prepared in 1824;
- Islington Proprietary School, Barnsbury Street, 1830;
- School for the Indigent Blind in St George's Fields, Southwark, 1834–8, in the Gothic style;
- St Olave's Girls' School, Maze Road, Southwark, 1839–40.

== Antiquarian ==
Newman collected antiquities found in London and the surrounding neighbourhood. Some bronzes in his possession from the bed of the Thames were mentioned in a paper by Charles Roach Smith, read before the Society of Antiquaries of London in June 1837. Among them was the colossal bronze head of Hadrian, now in the Anglo-Roman room of the British Museum. In 1842, Smith again made use of Newman's collection when reading another paper before the society on Roman Remains recently found in London.

In 1847, Newman exhibited before the British Archaeological Association an earthen vase of notable form found during the excavations for the new houses of parliament. His collection was sold by auction at Sotheby's in 1848. He was a fellow of the Society of Antiquaries from 1830 to 1849, and an original fellow of the Institute of British Architects, where he founded the travelling fund.

== Family ==
Newman married in 1819 a daughter of the Rev. Bartholomew Middleton, sub-dean of Chichester. The architect Arthur Shean Newman (1828–1873), partner of Arthur Billing, was his son.

== Notes ==
Attribution

This article incorporates text from a publication now in the public domain: Lee, Sidney, ed. (1894). "Newman, John (1786-1859)". Dictionary of National Biography. Vol. 40. London: Smith, Elder & Co.
