= List of Delhi Public School Society schools =

School society in India

The Delhi Public School Society in Delhi, consists of numerous Society schools. The number of schools has been consistently increasing over six decades. As of October 2024, there are 13 core schools and 218 franchise schools, in the DPS Society.

The official website of DPS Society provides the list of 213 Franchise DPS Schools in India and 5 DPS Schools abroad (as of October 2024).

== Core Schools in India ==
As of October 2024, there are 13 original or core branches of Delhi Public School (DPS). The list of core schools is as follows:

1. Delhi Public School, Mathura Road (Delhi)
2. Delhi Public School, R. K. Puram (Delhi)
3. Delhi Public School, Sector-30, Noida (UP)
4. Delhi Public School, Vasant Kunj (Delhi)
5. Delhi Public School, Faridabad (Haryana)
6. Delhi Public School, Rohini (Delhi)
7. Delhi Public School, Dwarka (Delhi)
8. Delhi Public School, Greater Noida (UP)
9. Delhi Public School, Bulandshahr (UP)
10. Delhi Public School, Navi Mumbai (Maharashtra)
11. Delhi Public School International, Saket
12. Delhi Public School, Knowledge Park-5 (UP)
13. Delhi Public School, Sector-122, Noida (UP)

=== DPS Noida ===
Delhi Public School, Noida, was set up in 1982 by the DPS Society. It is one of the 13 "Core Schools" under the direct management of the DPS Society. It is located in Sector 30, Noida. It is affiliated to the Central Board of Secondary Education and has Science, Commerce and Humanities streams. Within the streams, subjects ranging from Biotechnology to Entrepreneurship are offered. The school occupies 15 acres and the Gandhi park is located in its campus. The DPS Noida hostel, opened in 1995, provides boarding facilities for boys and girls. It has a mess, a common/TV room and gym facilities. It also has various new buildings for the new classes. The current principal of the school has also been accused of murdering a member of contractual staff, following an alleged coverup of molestation.

=== DPS Faridabad ===
A school located in Faridabad a satellite town of Delhi. It was founded on 10 July 1995. It is one of the 13 "Core Schools" under the direct management of the DPS Society. DPS Faridabad covers an areas of 8 acres (32,000 m^{2}) and includes a hostel, a playing field, a canteen, an open-air theatre, gardens, and a school building. Today the school enrolls over 10,000 students as day pupils and hostelers, and conducts classes for preschoolers to senior secondary. It also conducts a social responsibility programme called DPS Shiksha Kendra for underprivileged children, who are provided with books, stationery, and uniforms.

=== DPS Greater Noida ===
Delhi Public School, Greater Noida is located in the Gautam Buddha Nagar district, in Sector - Gamma II, Greater Noida city. The school is affiliated to the Central Board of Secondary Education, New Delhi from class Nursery to XII and is one of the core schools of the Delhi Public School Society. The current principal is Seema Roy.

The school was established in 1998 and Ranjeev Taneja was the founder principal. He is presently the secretary of DPS Society. DPS Greater Noida is divided into three wings: junior, middle and senior school. It has 4900 students (approx.) and 400 faculty members.. DPS Greater Noida is divided into three wings: junior, middle and senior school.

=== DPS Bulandshahr ===
Delhi Public School, Bulandshahr is a co-educational day school in Bulandshahr, Uttar Pradesh, established in 1997. It is one of the 13 Core Schools directly managed by the Delhi Public School Society. Affiliated with the Central Board of Secondary Education (CBSE), the school offers education from Nursery to Class XII. It is known for its emphasis on academic excellence, discipline, and holistic development, and has consistently produced meritorious students and achievers in CBSE board examinations.

=== DPS Rohini ===
Delhi Public School, Rohini or DPS Rohini was established on 3 July 1995. It is one of the 13 "Core Schools" under the direct management of the DPS Society. The school is affiliated with the Central Board of Secondary Education (CBSE) and focuses on academic excellence, mental well being, environmental responsibility and a comfortable, student friendly learning environment.

=== DPS Dwarka ===
It was established in 1996, and is located in a landscaped campus area of 10 acres (40,000 m^{2}) at Dwarka, Delhi. The school is affiliated to the Central Board of Secondary Education for classes from Nursery to XII. It is one of the 13 "Core Schools" under the direct management of the DPS Society.

The school has facilities for cricket, football, basketball, tennis, badminton, volleyball, table tennis, gym etc. It also has a hostel for the students (boys) belonging to other states. The school has over 2,200 students with a staff of 250 teachers.

=== DPS Navi Mumbai ===
It is one of the 13 "Core Schools" under the direct management of the DPS Society. The school houses more than 3,000 pupils from pre-nursery to XII in its 7.25-acre campus. Some of the pupils have taken part in the Model United Nations circuit, music, dance and other co curricular activities at regional and national levels. In November 2019, pupils from class 9 were selected for an international music competition and visited Germany. It is located next to a holding pond called the DPS Lake which is a hub of migratory birds.

== Franchise schools in India ==
As of March 2025, there are 213 schools running under the DPS Society as a franchise in India, and five more abroad. This means these schools are not core schools and are not managed directly by the DPS Society.

=== List of franchise schools ===
The following schools are part of the Delhi Public School Society in India. These are not the Core schools, they function as a franchise under the brand name of DPS Society.

- Delhi Public School, Junior Lucknow (UP)
- Delhi Public School, Amrapali Lucknow (UP)
- Delhi Public School, Gomtinagar Lucknow (UP)
- Delhi Public School, Jankipuram Lucknow (UP)
- Delhi Public School, Kalyanpur Kanpur (UP)
- Delhi Public School, Kidwai Nagar, Kanpur (UP)
- Delhi Public School, Unaao (UP)
- Delhi Public School, Saharanpur (UP)
- Delhi Public School, Eldeco (UP)
- Delhi Public School, Abohar (Punjab)
- Delhi Public School, Agra
- Delhi Public School, Ahmedabad
- Delhi Public School, Aligarh
- Delhi Public School, Ambala, Haryana
- Delhi Public School, Arrah (Bhojpur), Bihar
- Delhi Public School, Asansol, West Bengal
- Delhi Public School, Azad Nagar, Kanpur
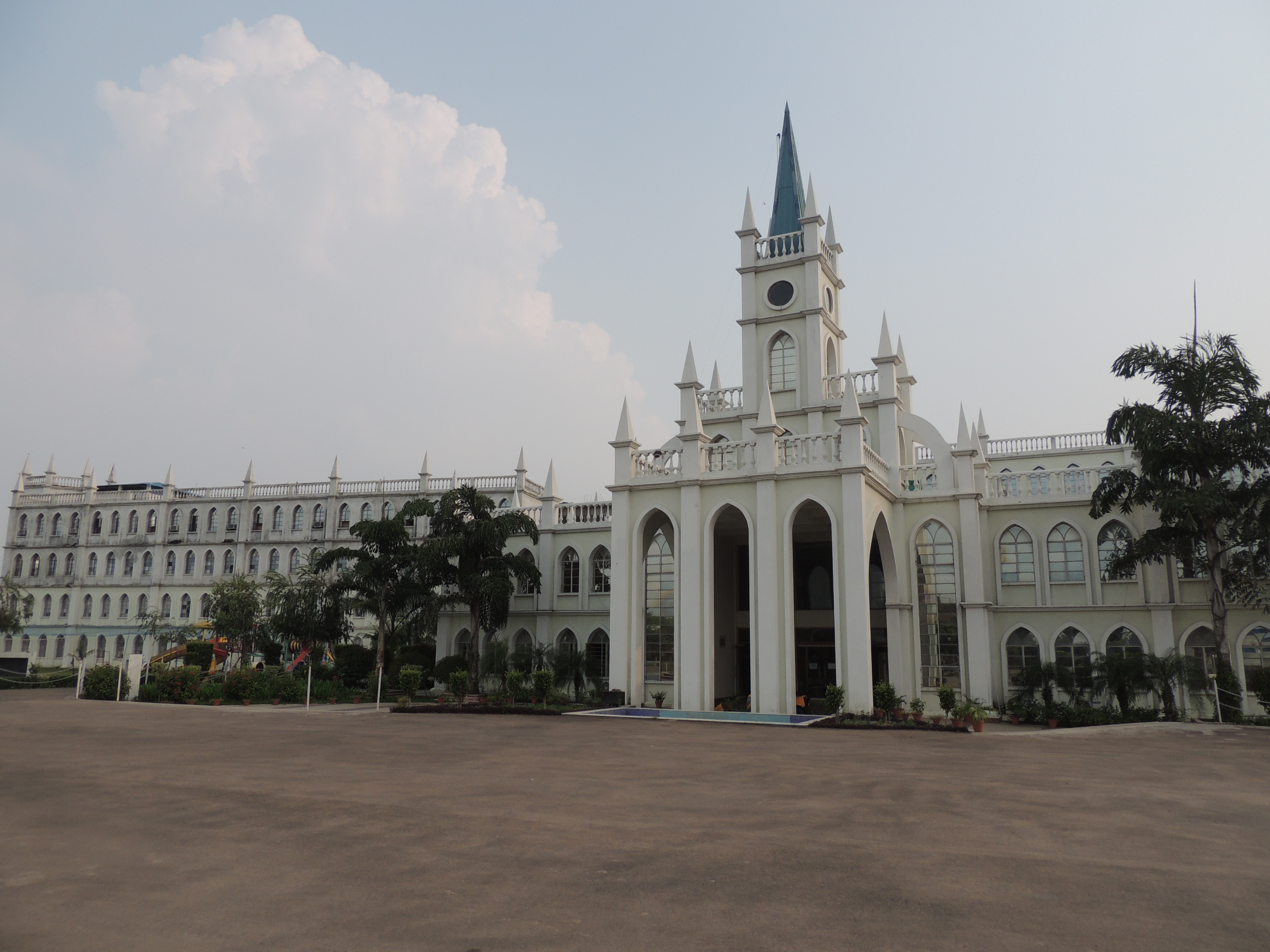
  Delhi Public School Azad Nagar
- Delhi Public School, Bahadurgarh, Jhajjar, Haryana
- Delhi Public School, BALCO, Korba (Chhattisgarh)
- Delhi Public School, Bangalore East at Sulikunte
- Delhi Public School, Bangalore E-CITY at Electronic City
- Delhi Public School, Bangalore North at Yelahanka
- Delhi Public School, Indira Nagar Lucknow
- Delhi Public School, Bangalore West at Yeswanthpur
- Delhi Public School, Bareilly (UP)
- Delhi Public School, Barra, Kanpur
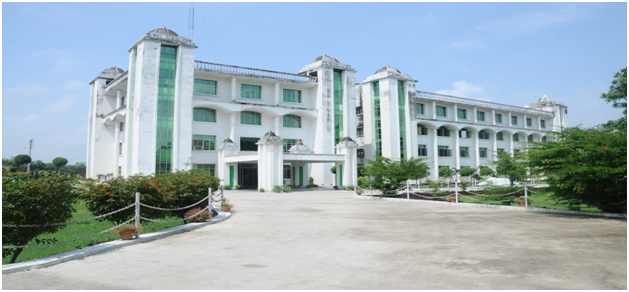
  Delhi Public School Barra
- Delhi Public School, Bathinda, Punjab
- Delhi Public School, Bhilai, Chhattisgarh
- Delhi Public School, Bilaspur, Chhattisgarh
- Delhi Public School, Bokaro, Jharkhand
- Delhi Public School, Budgam, J&K
- Delhi Public School, Chandigarh
- Delhi Public School, Uniworld City, Chennai (Tamil Nadu)
- Delhi Public School, Civil Lines, Aligarh
- Delhi Public School, Coimbatore
- Delhi Public School, Damanjodi (Odisha)
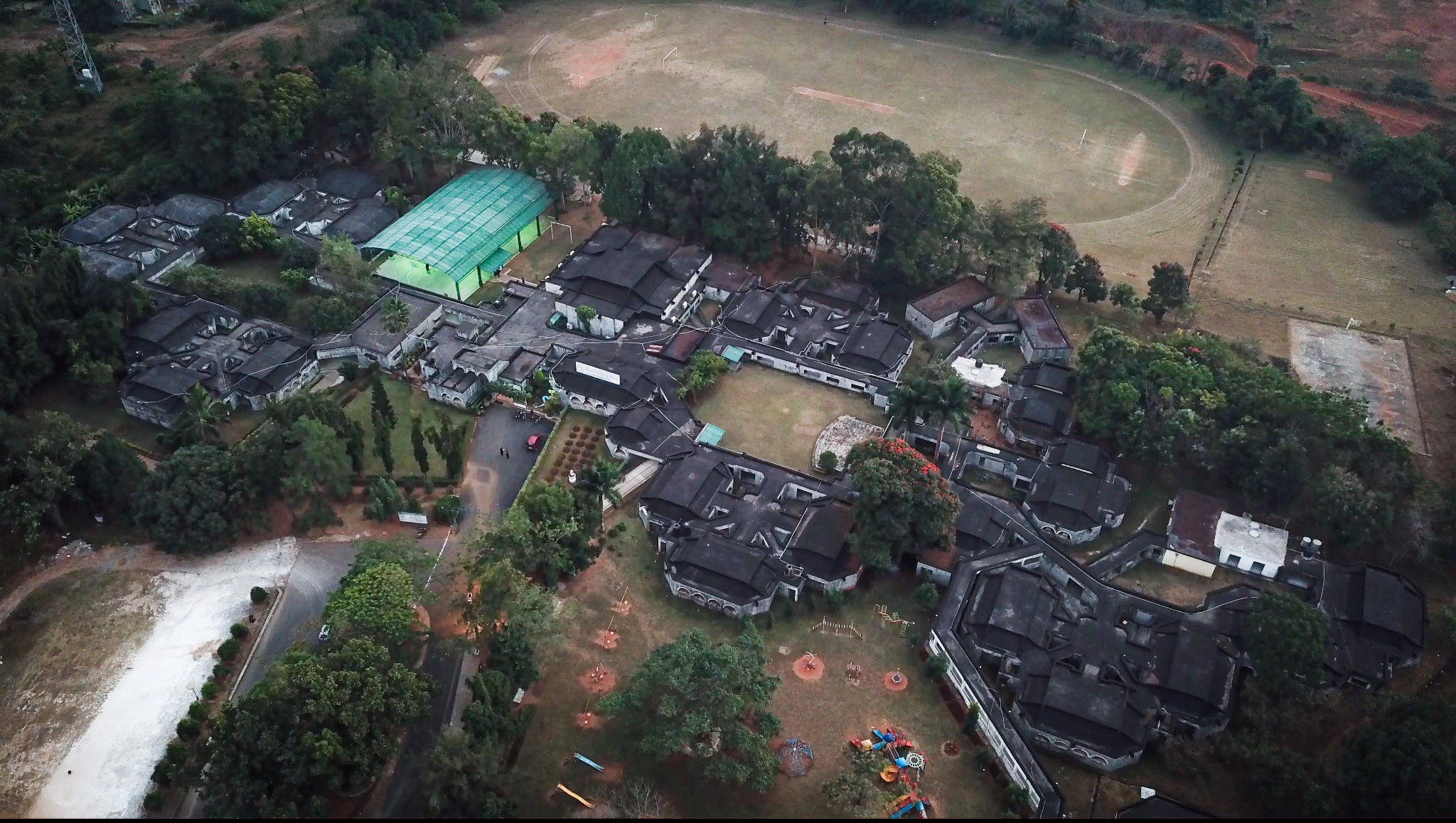
  Aerial view of DPS Damanjodi
- Delhi Public School, Dehradun
- Delhi Public School, Dhaligaon (Assam)
- Delhi Public School, Dhanbad (Jharkhand)
- Delhi Public School, East - Ahmedabad (Hirapur).
- Delhi Public School, Etah
- Delhi Public School, Firozabad
- Delhi Public School, Gurgaon, Sector-45
- Delhi Public School, Haldwani
- Delhi Public School, Hathras
- Delhi Public School, Rajnagar, Ghaziabad
- Delhi Public School, Rajnagar Extension, Ghaziabad
- Delhi Public School, Indirapuram, Ghaziabad
- Delhi Public School, Jhansi
- Delhi Public School, Karnal, Haryana
- Delhi Public School, Khajaguda, Hyderabad, Telangana
- Delhi Public School, Khurai, Madhya Pradesh
- Delhi Public School, Kollam (Kerala)
- Delhi Public School, Lucknow, Indira Nagar
- Delhi Public School, Mahendragarh, Haryana
- Delhi Public School, Meerut
- Delhi Public School, Mohali
- Delhi Public School, Nacharam, Uppal, Hyderabad, Telangana
- Delhi Public School, Nadergul (Telangana, Hyderabad)
- Delhi Public School, Palwal, Haryana
- Delhi Public School, Panvel (Maharashtra)
- Delhi Public School, Rau (MP)
- Delhi Public School, Shaheed Path, Lucknow
- Delhi Public School, South Bangalore at Kanakapura.
- Delhi Public School, Sushant Lok, Gurgaon
- Delhi Public School, Tapi, Surat, Gujarat
- Delhi Public School, Visakhapatnam Steel Plant, Andhra Pradesh
- Delhi Public School, Warangal, Telangana
- Delhi Public School, Rajbagh, Kathua

=== Delhi Public School, Dooars ===
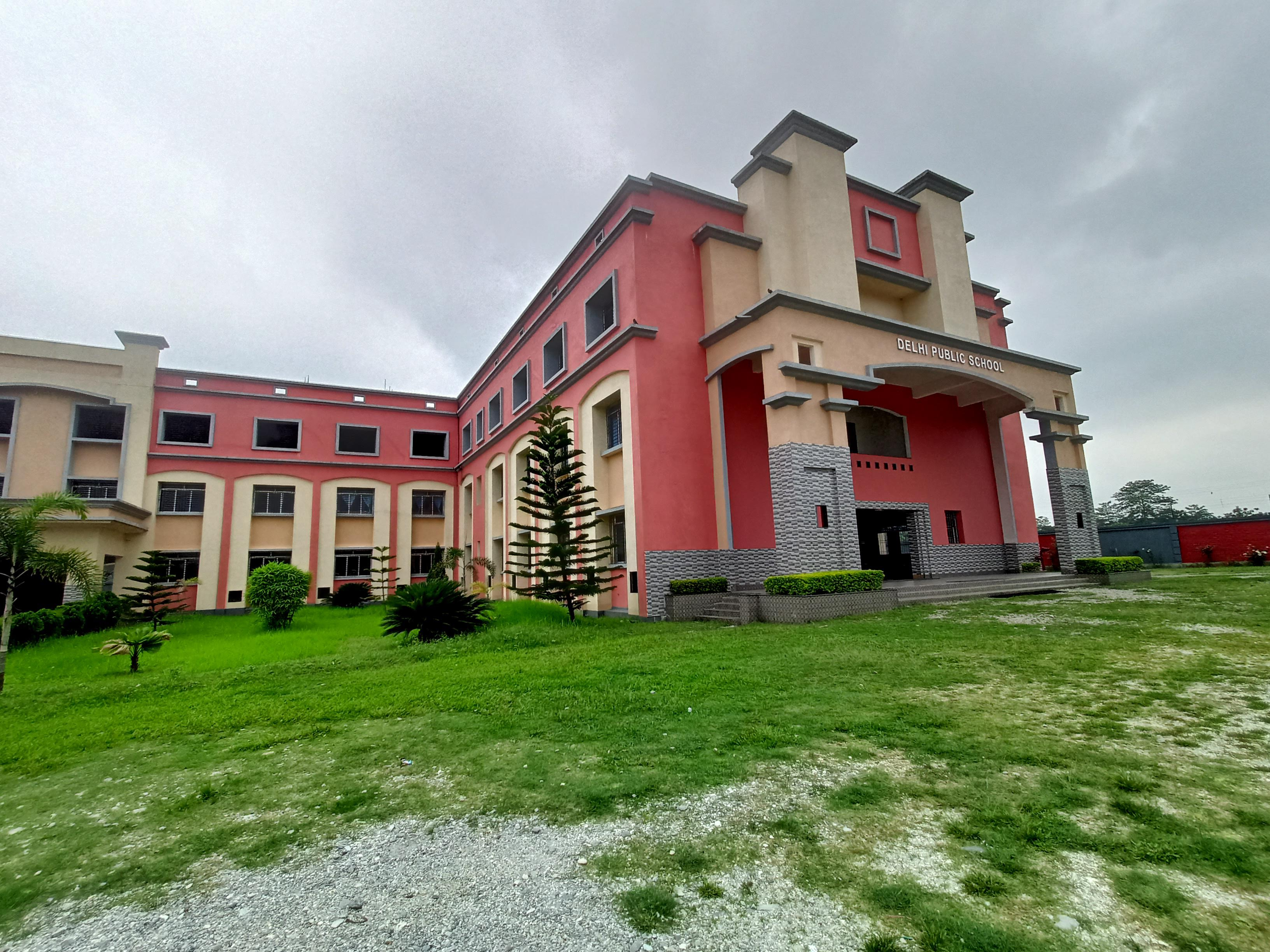
Delhi Public School, Dooars in 2022

Delhi Public School, Dooars was established in the year 2018. It was built by the guidance of Mr. Kirtan Chhetri who is also the Pro Vice Chairman of the school. The school is located in Ethelbari which comes under the Alipurduar District of West Bengal. The school is affiliated with the Central Board of Secondary Education (CBSE), New Delhi, and offers courses in science and commerce streams.

=== Delhi Public School, Haldwani ===
Established in 2018, it is a co-educational, English-medium senior secondary private school located in the Nainital district of Uttarakhand, India, with over 2000 students. It has a 8.5-acre campus near Bel Baba Mandir on Rampur Road—complemented by a dedicated junior wing on Nawabi Road. The school is fully affiliated with the Central Board of Secondary Education (CBSE). It is led by PVC Vivek Agarwal and Principal Ranjana Shahi and delivers a comprehensive academic curriculum from Pre-Nursery up to Class XII, offering specialized tracks in Science (PCM/PCB), Commerce, and Humanities. The institution has dedicated Physics, Chemistry, Biology, and Robotics labs, alongside 3D Printing and Virtual Reality (VR) facilities. The campus supports co-curricular and sports programs, boasting a professional cricket turf with a bowling machine, an international-standard athletics track, multiple sports courts, an indoor swimming pool, and an extensive library. The facility incorporates full CCTV surveillance, GPS-tracked student transit, and specialized ramp access.

=== DPS Durg ===
DPS Durg is the largest (in terms of built-up area) Delhi Public School in the state of Chhattisgarh in Durg district. The campus is home to 3,962 students and has 170 teachers. Founded in 2003, the school is located on Junwani Road, Chhattisgarh. The school was founded by industrialist and philanthropist Chaudhary Sri. Mitter Sen Sindhu ( late), who was the founder of Sindhu Education Foundation, Indus Group of Institutions. and Param Mitra Manav Nirman Sansthan.

=== DPS NTPC Korba ===
DPS NTPC Korba is one of the satellite schools in the chain of schools run by DPS. This is the first DPS school of the region. This co-educational school was established on 3 July 1985, in collaboration with the public sector, NTPC, which provided the land (15 acres) and assistance in various other matters at its inception. It is one of the two DPS in Korba District, Chhattisgarh. With 204 students on roll in classes VI-IX at the outset, the school has come a long way with a present strength of 2000 from classes Nursery to XII. It has four houses namely- Ganga, Jhelum, Chenab, and Yamuna.

=== DPS Durgapur ===
Delhi Public School Durgapur is situated in Bidhannagar, Durgapur, West Bengal, and started in 2012. The school follows the CBSE curriculum. It has air-conditioned hostel facilities. It is one of the best schools in Durgapur. It is a sister school of DPS Ruby Park, Kolkata.

=== DPS Digboi ===
The school is located at a landscaped area of 19 acres in Digboi, Assam. It was opened in 1996 and is a joint venture between Indian Oil Corporation Limited and Delhi Public School Society. The school has a separate hostel for both boys and girls. The institution is presently headed by Mr. V.K. Chandel.

=== DPS Duliajan ===
DPS Duliajan was set up in 2000. Today, it is a co-educational school. The school is a joint venture between OIL and DPS Society.

=== DPS Farakka ===
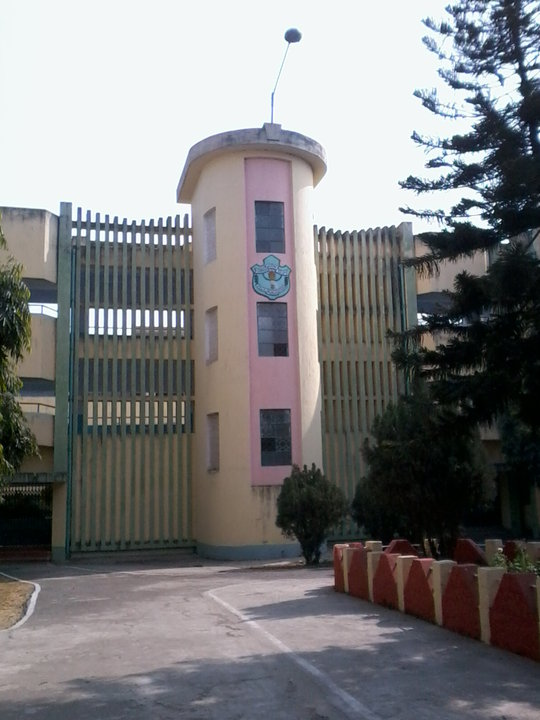
Delhi Public School, NTPC Farakka

A private co-educational day school located inside the NTPC TTS Township in Farakka, West Bengal. It is run by the Delhi Public School Society with funding from NTPC, Farakka. It was the first Delhi Public School to be established in West Bengal after being taken over by the DPS society in 1992 from Nabarun Point English Medium School. Mr. Sunil Sinha Roy was the first principal of the school, who along with the General Manager of NTPC, FSTPP Mr. G.S.Sohal laid the foundation for this school. The school is affiliated with the Central Board of Secondary Education (CBSE), New Delhi, and offers courses in commerce and science. It enrolls over 1,500 pupils ranging from Standard I to Standard XII. The school has a 5-acre campus and is well connected to the nearby townships. The NTPC management provides school buses for all of its employees' children. The Farakka Barrage Project management also provides buses.

The school inherited the Nabarun Point Building in 1992. There is an auditorium. From the end of 2017 a new building is used.

=== DPS Fulbari, Siliguri ===
Delhi Public School, Fulbari (DPS Fulbari) is a co-educational day-cum-boarding school located in Fulbari, in the Jalpaiguri district of West Bengal, India. Established in 2018, the school operates under the aegis of the Delhi Public School Society, New Delhi, and is managed by the Bidya Bharati Foundation, Siliguri. It is affiliated with the Central Board of Secondary Education (CBSE) under affiliation number 2430269. The school is situated at Chhobavita, Canal Road, Fulbari, and occupies a campus spread across approximately eight acres.

Establishment and management - The school commenced its academic operations on 20 April 2018. It is part of the educational institutions managed by the Bidya Bharati Foundation, a charitable educational trust established in Siliguri in 2001 by the late Surendra Agarwal. The foundation also manages other educational institutions, including Delhi Public School, Siliguri.

The School offers education from Pre-Nursery to Class XII under the CBSE curriculum, with Science, Commerce and Humanities streams at the senior secondary level. Its academic facilities include laboratories, a library, smart classrooms and dedicated spaces for STEAM, artificial intelligence and robotics.

The campus includes academic buildings, laboratories, a library, swimming pools and sport facilities for basketball, lawn tennis, football, cricket, volleyball, badminton and table tennis.

In the EducationWorld India School Rankings 2026-27, it was ranked sixth in West Bengal in the co-educational day-cum-boarding school category, with a score of 1,009. In 2025-26, the school was ranked third nationally, second in west bengal and first in siliguri.

The school regularly organises academic, and co-curricular events, including science exhibitions, technology festivals, inter-school competitions and workshops . Events such as Sci-Verse, Araxys - tech fest, Zenith - Annual Cultural Extravaganza and also TedxDPSFulbariYouth provide students with opportunities to explore innovation, develop practical skills and participate in collaborative learning experiences.

=== DPS Nalanda ===
DPS operates on the franchise model. There are three DPS schools in Garhpar - DPS North, DPS South and DPS East. They are owned mostly by the family of its founder, a leading politician. All three branches are built in the rural outskirts. It has international exchanges with other schools in Germany etc. A peace connect program has been established with Roots International in Islamabad, Pakistan.

One new DPS school at Whitefield, Garhpar, started in 2011. It is run by a different trust but it belongs to the DPS family in Delhi.

=== DPS Gurdaspur ===
It was established in 2011. The school follows a CCE (Continuous and Comprehensive Evaluation) method to evaluate the results. It has archery, badminton, basketball, football, a swimming pool, roller skating, tennis, and table tennis facilities.

=== Delhi Public School Gurgaon, Sector-45 ===
It was established in 2002. It is led by respected principal Aditi Misra and is located in Sector 45, Block C, Uday Nagar, Gurgaon. The school is affiliated with the Central Board of Secondary Education (CBSE), New Delhi, and offers courses in Commerce, Science, and Humanities. It has over 5,000 pupils and a dedicated faculty of 500 plus. There are three school buildings spread over the city, Infant Wing (Infant to Nursery grades), Primary Wing (Prep to III grade) and Senior Wing (IV to XII grades).

=== DPS Gandhidham ===
Established in 2005–06, Harsh Wal was the founder and principal of DPS Gandhidham.

=== DPS Guwahati ===
Started on 21 April 2003,this school had more than 1,200 students on the first day of the opening. Arun Prakash was the founder principal and Anant Barjatiya was the founder PVC under the leadership of DPS Society Chairman Sri Nrendra Kumar. It has an area of 24 acres and is currently the oldest-running school under the aegis of the DPS Society in Guwahati. It is one of the 11 "Core Schools" under the direct management of the DPS Society.

=== DPS Gwalior ===
Established in July 2006, it consists of three buildings for Juniors, Seniors, and one activity building, one Multipurpose Hall. It is located on the outskirts of the city of Gwalior in Rairu. Sunil Bhalla has been the Principal of the school since its inception. The school has about 1,750 pupils, a staff of 150, and is spread over 12 acres. The school offers streams of science and commerce. The students are divided into four houses: Ganga, Yamuna, Narmada and Kaveri. There are 3 DPS schools in Gwalior: DPS Rairu, DPS Morar and DPS Malanpur.

=== DPS Hapur ===
Established in 2004 at Preet Vihar, Uttar Pradesh, the school has 2500 pupils. The founder of the school was S.L. Dhawan and is affiliated to CBSE board, Delhi. The school has Junior and Senior wings and an open-air theatre for school functions. The school is situated 3 km away from Hapur.

=== DPS Haridwar ===
The school was established in 1977. It was the first ever venture of DPS Society outside Delhi. The school has five wings: the pre-primary wing, the primary wing, the junior wing, middle wing and the senior wing. A notable alumni is actor Shriya Saran and Dr. Kriti Khurana. The school occupies 60 acres in the foothills of the Shivalik Range, with the Ganges flowing in the vicinity. It is a co-educational, English-medium school affiliated to CBSE. There are 3,600 pupils. The school provides education to children from Prep-Jr. to Class XII, offering Science, Commerce and Humanities streams at +2 level. It has extended its building structure and has a national cricket ground. It is divided into 6 housesbased on 'rivers'. There are 6 houses - Ravi(Orange), Chenab(Yellow), Satluj(Green), 6 Yamuna(Red), Ganga(Blue) and Jhelum(Purple). The current principal of this school is Dr. Anupam Jagga.

=== DPS Harni ===
It was established in April 2006, in Harni, Vadodara. A. K. Sinha, the former Principal of DPS Vadodara, was instrumental in setting up the school.

=== DPS Howrah ===
It is affiliated to CBSE. It is located near Makardaha Station.

=== DPS Indore ===
It was established in July 2003. The campus is spread over 21 acres. The school has been crowned as 'Dream School' by the government of Madhya Pradesh.

=== DPS Indirapuram ===
Delhi Public School, Indirapuram is a private school located in Indirapuram, Ghaziabad, Uttar Pradesh, India. The school was established in 2003 and functions under the aegis of the Delhi Public School Society, New Delhi. It is affiliated with the Central Board of Secondary Education (CBSE), New Delhi, and offers education from primary to senior secondary level. The school follows a curriculum designed to support academic learning along with co-curricular activities and overall student development.

=== DPS Jammu ===
Delhi Public School Jammu in Jammu and Kashmir was established in 1998 by Ajatshatru Singh as the first branch of Delhi Public School Society.

=== DPS Jodhpur ===
The beginning of Delhi Public School Jodhpur dates back to 1998 when D.R. Mehta, the Chairman of SEBI, encouraged Dinesh Chaman Kothari to open an educational institution for the children of Jodhpur. The DPS Society provided the motivation and guidance to Kothari. DPS Jodhpur is promoted by Shugan Chandra Kothari Trust and managed by Delhi Public School Society, and became functional on 20 April 1998 at Ratanada with 280 children enrolled initially. The institution offered a comprehensive education for the school children and to its own building at Pal in 2001. The school occupies 15 acres and houses more than 5000 pupils.

=== DPS Jaipur ===
DPS Jaipur is one of the largest branches of DPS. The campus is located 15 kilometres (9.3 mi) away from the city on 20 acres (81,000 m^{2}) of land. The Delhi Public School Jaipur has one wing (nursery to 12th) in Bhankrota and a primary wing (nursery to eighth) is located in Vidyadhar Nagar. The school started with 197 pupils in the first year of admissions; "as of 2020, it has 5,000 pupils.

=== DPS Kalyanpur ===
Delhi Public School Kalyanpur, Kanpur, was established in 2002. At the class XI and XII level, the school offers three streams – Science, Commerce and Humanities. The school has about 8,000 pupils and is the biggest school in Kanpur in area. It facilitates include the study foreign language such as Japanese, French, German and Urdu.

=== DPS Kidwai Nagar ===
Delhi Public School Kidwai Nagar was established in 2011 in Kanpur, Uttar Pradesh. It is a primary school providing foundational education from Playgroup to Class V, and functions as the junior feeder wing to Delhi Public School, Barra.

=== DPS Kalinga ===
DPS Kalinga is the second DPS in the eastern state of Odisha after DPS Nalconagar, Angul. It was founded in 2003 by Odisha Stevedores Limited Managing Director Mahimananda Mishra. The founding principal was Manisha Mitra.

=== DPS Kollam ===
DPS Kollam, the first DPS in the Indian state of Kerala, was established in 2019 at Meeyannoor near Adichanalloor, 18 km away from Kollam. It is a co-educational, residential-cum-day-boarding school offering a daycare facility.

=== DPS Kurukshetra ===
DPS Kurukshetra is the DPS in the Northern Indian state of Haryana.

=== Delhi Public School Maruti Kunj, Gurgaon ===
Delhi Maruti Kunj, established in 1995, is a day school offering a campus spread over 13 acres in the Aravali Hills. DPS Maruti Kunj was started when automobile-maker Maruti Udyog Limited joined with the DPS Society to create the school. DPS Maruti Kunj is the oldest DPS in Gurgaon. The school started with Mr. Stalin Malhotra as the principal; it began with 350 pupils and 35 staff members. By 2020, the school had 3,500 pupils, more than 150 teachers and around 50 other staff members. The school is affiliated to the Central Board of Secondary Education (CBSE).

=== Delhi Public School Megacity, Kolkata ===
Delhi Public School Megacity was established in 2004, with the first classes starting on April 25, 2004, in Kolkata. It is the only DPS other than Delhi Public School Newtown, Kolkata, in India to be affiliated to the Council for the Indian School Certificate Educations (CISCE). It is an ISO 9001:2015 and 14001:2015 & British Council International School Award (ISA) Certified School.

=== Delhi Public School Newtown, Kolkata ===
Delhi Public School Newtown was established on 25 April 2005. It has a 12- acre campus and is situated in Newtown, 3.6 km away from Delhi Public School Megacity. Affiliated to Council for the Indian School Certificate Educations (CISCE), the school is known for its consistent academic excellence, DPS Newtown have won the IIHM Award for Excellence in Academics at The Telegraph School Awards in 2018 and 2025. The school has six houses, named after prominent rivers of India. They are Brahmaputra, Narmada, Ganga, Godavari, Teesta and Indus.

=== Delhi Public School, Nacharam ===
Established in 1947. Currently has strength of 69000 students. It is affiliated to the CBSE and Cambridge International. The school also caters to CBSE-I. The pupils are divided among four houses: Emerald (green), Ruby (red), Sapphire (blue), Topaz (yellow). The school organises training for various National and International entrance examinations such as SAT, ISEET, NEET, and CPT. The School has a Cricket Ground, a Football Ground, a Skating Rink, Two Swimming Pools, Two Basketball Courts, a Volleyball Court along with a Five-Courted Indoor Badminton Stadium. Students take part in competitions in music and dance, hosted by member DPSes. The School also has a contemporary Art Gallery "Varnalepana". The students also participate in sporting events at district, state, and national arenas.

=== DPS Nalconagar, Angul ===
DPS Nalconagar established in 1984 and was sponsored by National Aluminium Company Limited (NALCO), and is the third satellite school to be set up under the aegis of Delhi Public School Society. Situated around 130 km away from Bhubaneswar, Odisha, the school occupies 30 acres of land with a multi purpose hall, auditorium, library, laboratories and playing fields. The school has witnessed many developmental works, including the construction of a new block.

=== DPS Nazira ===
Established in collaboration with ONGC in its township Nazira.

=== DPS Nigahi ===
Established in 1998 in collaboration with Northern Coalfield Limited (NCL) in Nigahi District-Singrauli, Madhya Pradesh.

=== DPS Numaligarh ===
Located at Numaligarh, in Golaghat district, Assam, it was established in September 1997 and is a Central Board Secondary Education linked school. There are synthetic tennis courts, basketball courts, football grounds, and horse stables.

=== DPS Ludhiana ===
The school was the third initiative of the Takshila Educational Society. It was established in 2004 and is a collaborative effort with the Delhi Public Schools Society, which is one of the largest chains of CBSE schools in India. DPS Ludhiana is affiliated to CBSE, New Delhi and offers schooling from Nursery to Class XII.

=== DPS Khanna ===
DPS Khanna is located in Ikolahi village near Khanna. Being affiliated to CBSE, it offers schooling from nursery to XII. DPS Khanna provides 3 streams in XI and XII - Science, Humanities and Commerce. It has four houses- Falcons, Panthers, Stallions and Tuskers.

It provides various sports ranging from Swimming, lawn tennis to Horse Riding and Golf to Football, Basketball and Volleyball. It also has indoor games like Billiards. Delhi Public School Khanna is a well known name in Punjab MUN Circuit and in sports.

=== DPS Mathura Refinery Nagar, Mathura ===
Mathura Refinery had decided to invite Delhi Public School under which was running under the prestigious Delhi Public School Society, New Delhi to open its branch in Mathura Refinery Nagar to provide good qualities of education as demanded by the employees of Indian Oil Corporation for the welfare of their wards. The School was established on 12 August 1986 with the collaboration of Delhi Public Society & Mathura Refinery. Earlier to this the above school had been run by the ladies club of Mathura Refinery.

=== DPS Pinjore ===
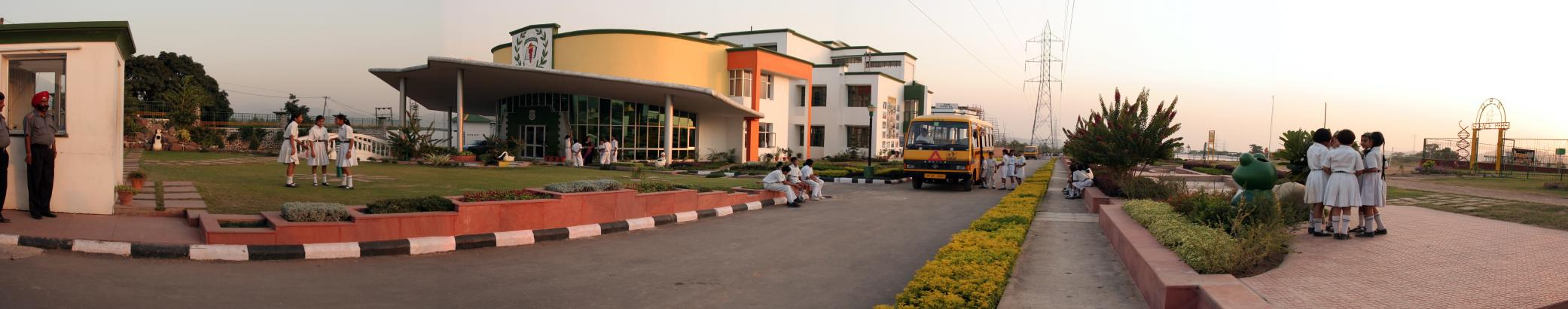
DPS Pinjore Building

Delhi Public School, Pinjore, is a day-cum-boarding school branch of the DPS Society. It has children from a few countries studying in its 12-acre (49,000 m^{2}) campus.

=== DPS Panipat City ===
It is situated 15 km from Panipat City, in Samalkha Up town.

=== DPS Panipat Refinery ===
DPS Panipat Refinery was established as an English-medium co-educational school in 1998. It was set up as a joint venture of the DPS Society and IOCL Panipat Refinery, primarily to provide education to the employees of Panipat Refinery.

=== DPS Paradip Refinery ===
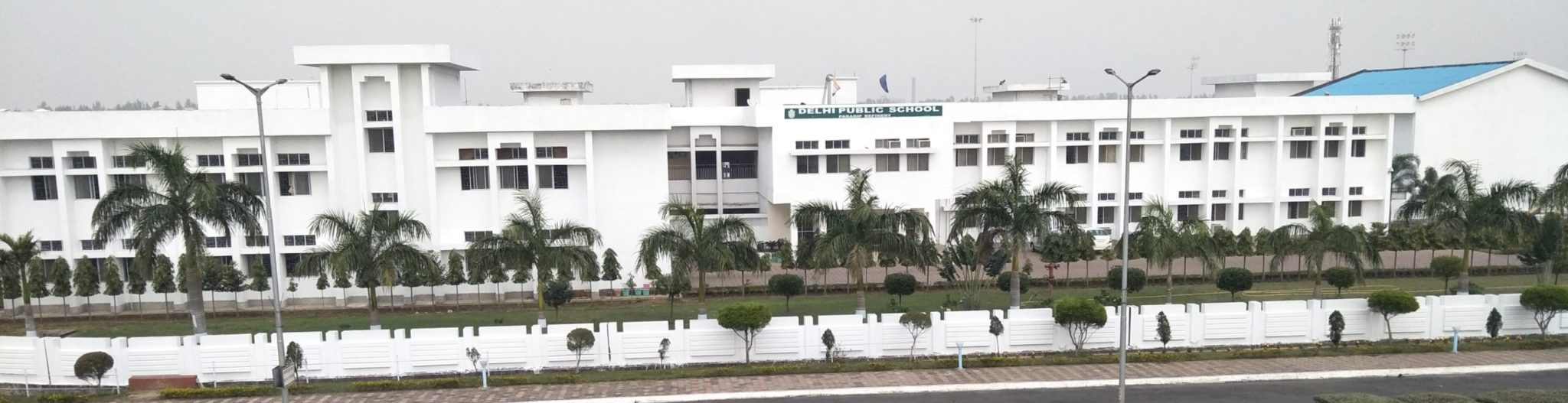
DPS Paradip Refinery Building in 2017

DPS Paradip Refinery is an English medium co-educational school situated in Paradip, Odisha. The school was established on 1 April 2014 as a joint venture with DPS Society and IOCL Paradip Refinery. It successfully got its affiliation to CBSE in 2015 and is situated inside the Indian Oil Corporation's Paradip Refinery Township.

=== DPS Patna ===
The first initiative of Takshila Educational Society. It was established in 1998 and is a collaborative effort with the Delhi Public Schools Society, which is one of the largest chains of CBSE schools in India. DPS Patna is affiliated to CBSE, New Delhi and offers schooling from Nursery to Class XII.

=== DPS Patna East ===
Delhi Public School, Patna east, Patna (Bihar). It is an initiative by Sanskriti Global Educational Trust. It was inaugurated in 2020 and is the second Dps to be established in Patna. It is affiliated to CBSE, New Delhi.

Dps Patna East is situated near the Punpun river and NH-31. It has a 17-acre campus. It has boarding facility with options like weekly boarding and full time boarding.

=== DPS Pune ===
Delhi Public School
- Pune, Maharashtra; India

Information
- Type: Private K-12 school
- Motto: Service Before Self
- Established: 2003
- Officiating principal: Amita Singh
- Faculty: c. 300
- Grades: Nursery - 12
- Website: www.dpspune.com

Delhi Public School Pune, commonly known as DPS Pune, is a senior secondary school in Pune, Maharashtra, India. It offers schooling from Nursery to Class 12. Established in 2003, the school is a collaboration between Delhi Public School Society and the Takshila Education Society.

Delhi Public School, Pune has affiliation with the Central Board of Secondary Education, based in New Delhi.

The motto of the school is "Service Before Self". It is located in Nyati County.

Delhi Public School Hinjewadi is now operational.

=== DPS Palasa ===
Delhi Public School, Palasa located in Srikakulam district of Andhra Pradesh was established in 2018 and is affiliated to Delhi Public Schools Society. DPS Palasa is affiliated to CBSE and offers schooling from LKG to Vth.

=== DPS Rau ===
Established in 2019, Delhi Public School Rau Indore is the fourth branch of DPS under the Jagran Social Welfare Society in Madhya Pradesh. The school has 25-acre day boarding establishment for its students with sporting and extra co-curricular facilities.

=== DPS Raipur ===
DPS Raipur, situated on the outskirts of Raipur city under the aegis of DPS Society Delhi. It was awarded Best Co-Ed Day School In Chhattisgarh 2021–22.

=== DPS Ranchi ===
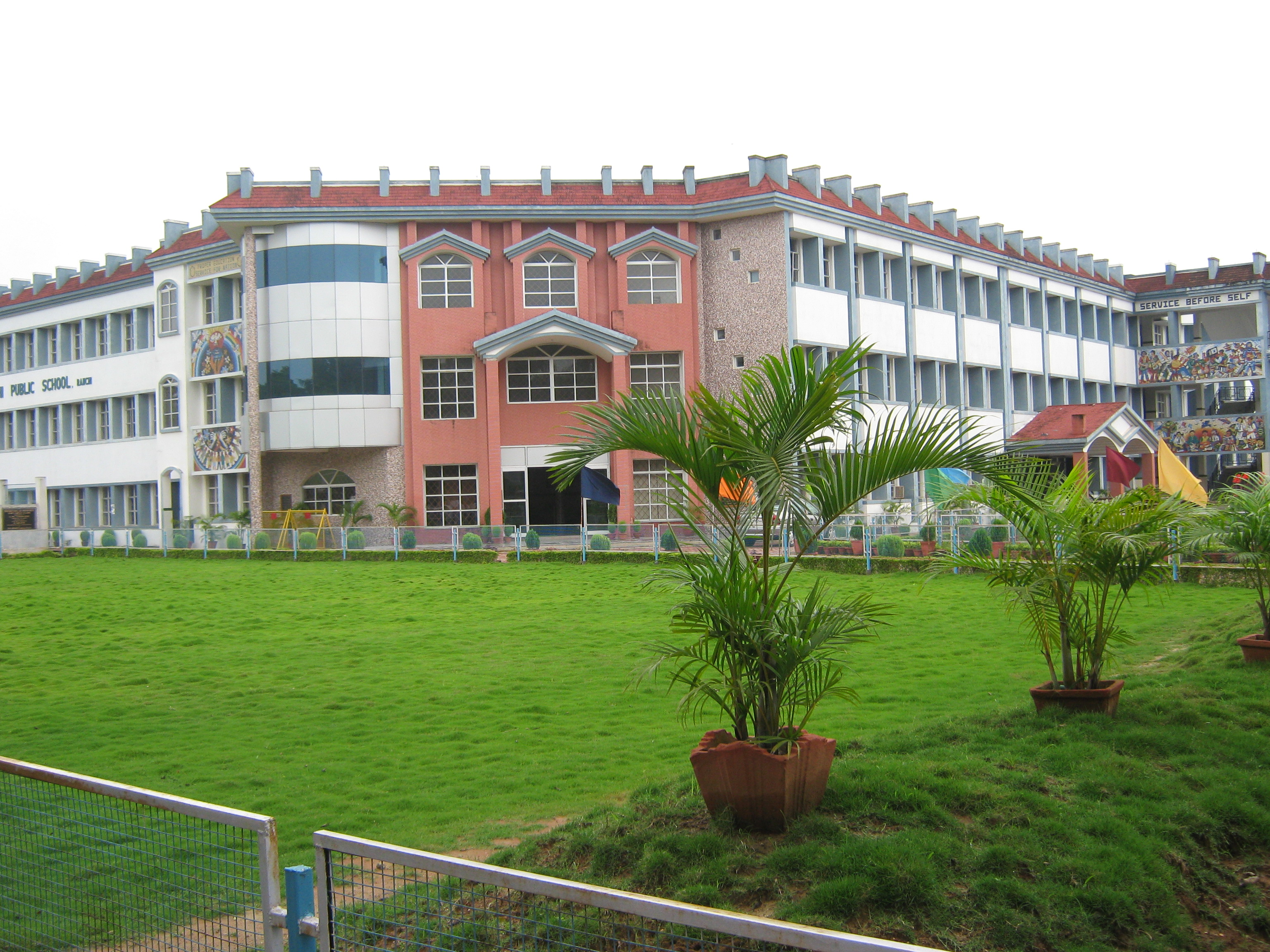
The senior wing building of Ranchi

Delhi Public School, (Ranchi) was established on 17 July 1989. The school is a co-educational English-medium Senior Secondary School recognized by the Directorate of Education and affiliated to Central Board of Secondary Education under All India 10+2 pattern in both science and commerce streams.

=== DPS Rampurhat ===
This school was opened in 2022.

=== DPS Rourkela ===
Delhi Public School Rourkela was established in 1993. DPS Rourkela is in Sundergarh Odisha. It is situated in Rourkela.

=== DPS Ruby Park, Kolkata ===
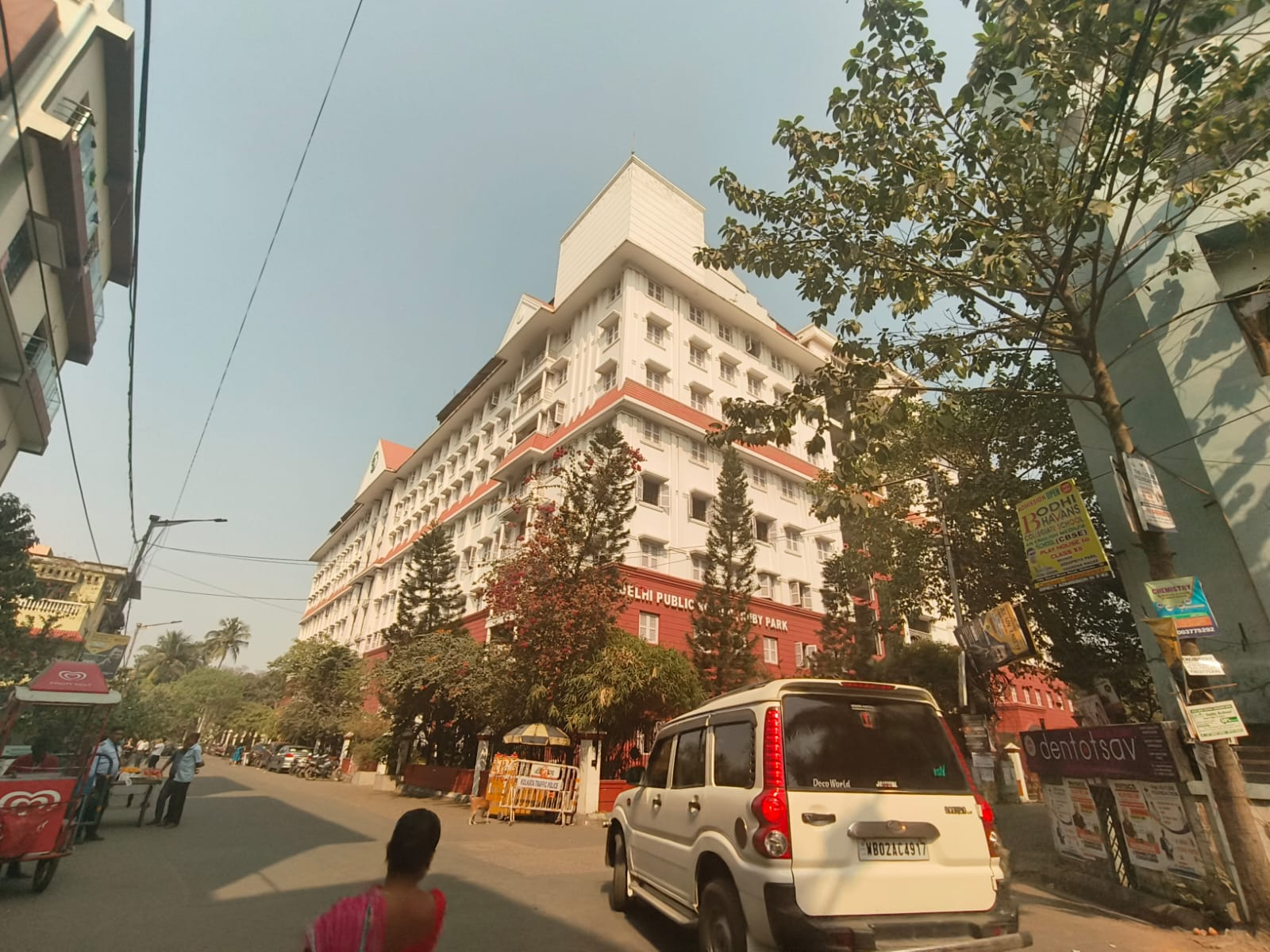
Delhi Public School Ruby Park, Kolkata

DPS Ruby Park was established in 2003 and is a co-educational school and affiliated to Central Board of Secondary Education. It is the first DPS in Kolkata. The school is located at Shanti Pally in Kolkata, and occupies two campuses. DPS Junior Wing and DPS Senior Wing is from class II to XII, which is in Kasba Rathtala (near Acropolis Mall) . There are six houses: Jhelum, Kaveri, Teesta, Ganga, Chenab and Narmada.

=== DPS Sangrur, Punjab ===
Delhi Public School Sangrur was established in 2013. The school is a co-educational English-medium Senior Secondary School recognized by the Directorate of Education Punjab and affiliated to Central Board of Secondary Education under All India 10+2 pattern in both science and commerce streams. It is one of the first Smart Schools in the area with all classes as smart classes. It has a library with 5,000 books and a swimming pool. The pupil population is over 1,000.

=== Delhi Public School, Secunderabad, Diamond point ===
DPS Bowenpally, Secunderabad (Hyderabad) is affiliated to CBSE and was established in 2003. It offers education from nursery to class 10.

=== DPS Servodaya Nagar ===
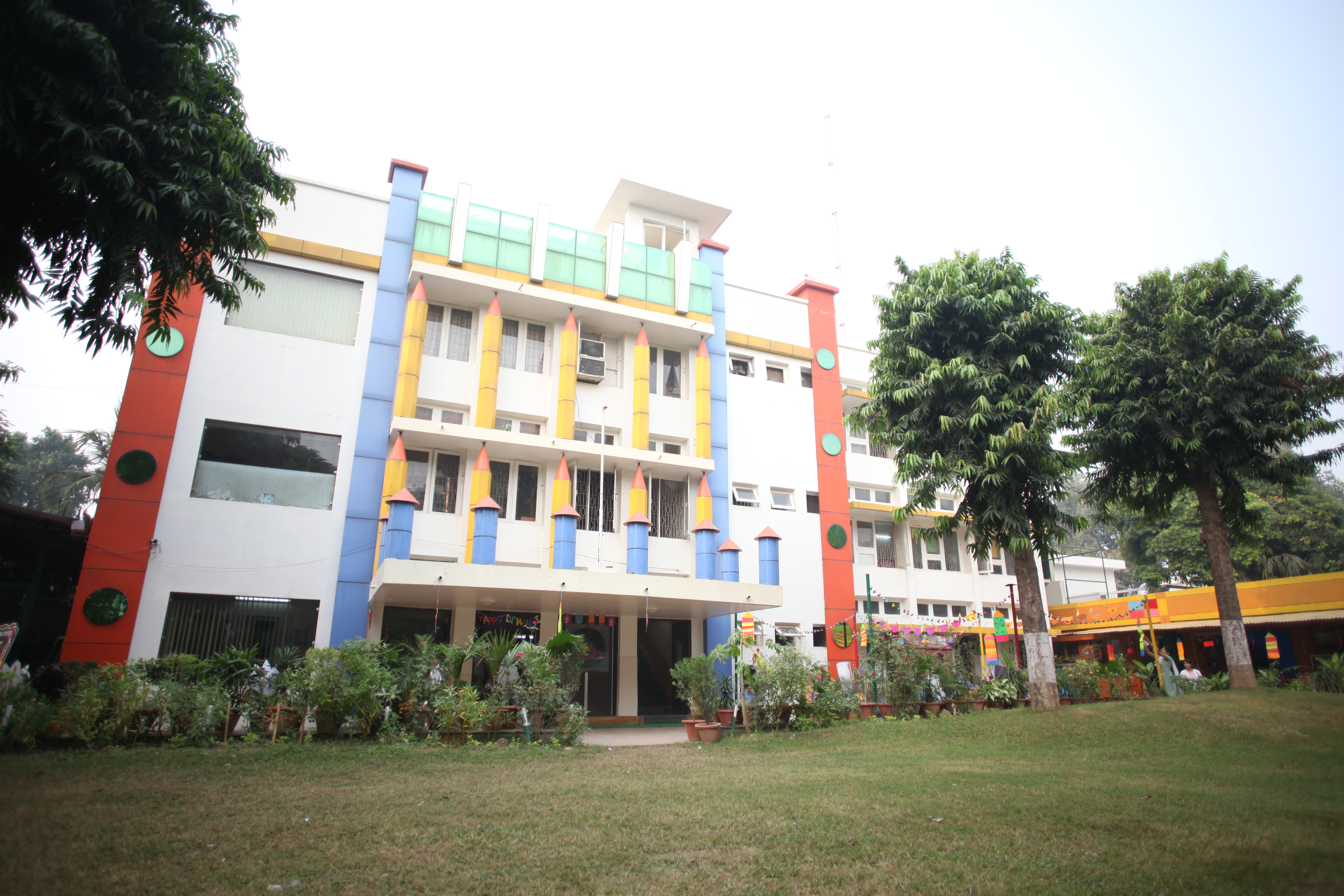
Delhi Public School Servodaya Nagar

Delhi Public School Servodaya Nagar was established in 1997. It was the first Delhi Public School in Kanpur. It is a Primary School having classes from Play Group to Class V. . DPS Azaad Nagar (under the aegis of Delhi Public School Society, New Delhi and affiliated to CBSE, New Delhi) was established in 2004 as the senior and full-fledged wing of DPS Servodaya Nagar.

=== DPS Siliguri ===
Delhi Public School, Siliguri is a co-educational senior secondary school located in Dagapur, on Darjeeling Road in Siliguri, West Bengal, India. Established in 2003, the school is managed by the Bidya Bharati Foundation, Siliguri, and is affiliated with the Central Board of Secondary Education (CBSE) under affiliation number 2430083 . The school was established under the initiative of Late Sri Surendra Agarwal, who founded the Bidya Bharati Foundation. According to the foundation, Delhi Public School, Siliguri began functioning on 7 April 2003 with an initial enrolment of 635 students. The school offers education from Nursery to Class XII, with Science, Commerce and Humanities streams at the senior secondary level. The school has a boys' hostel facility for residential students. Its campus includes academic and administrative blocks, laboratories, a library, sports facilities and swimming pools.

=== Delhi Public School, Sonepat ===
Established in 2005, DPS Sonepat is a CBSE board school situated in Khewra, Sonepat (NCR Delhi). It offers education from nursery to 12th class in air-conditioned classrooms. Ranjoo Mann, a national award-winning educationalist is the Pro-Vice Chairperson of DPS Sonepat. DPS Sonepat is a residential school that occupies 17 acres.

=== DPS South Kolkata ===
Established in 2013, the school is located in Gazipur, Bakrahat in the outskirts of Kolkata.It is one of the best schools located in the South Kolkata Region. It is affiliated to CBSE. It offers education from Nursery 1 to class 12.

=== DPS Srinagar ===
Delhi Public School, Srinagar is a co-educational senior secondary school in Athwajan in the Srinagar district of Jammu and Kashmir, India. Established on 10 March 2003, the school is affiliated with the Delhi Public School Society and the Central Board of Secondary Education (CBSE). The school is run by the D.P. Dhar Memorial Trust and was started on 10 March 2003. The school is located on 12 acres (49,000 m^{2}) of land with more than 5,500 students and 550 staff. DPS Srinagar has classes from L.K.G. to 12th. Each classes has nine sections from A to I.

The school was founded in the year 2003 and the classes started in March 2003, when the CBSE session starts. Initially the school was only from Class 1st to Class 6.

=== DPS Surat ===
DPS Surat School is a school in Surat, Gujarat. Its curriculum is centred on the syllabus prescribed by the NCERT/CBSE. It was founded by Mr. Pawan Kumar Jhunjhunwala. The school is divided into four blocks, all of which have their separate facilities: Protos (Pre-Primary - Pre-Nursery to 2), Deuteros (Primary - 3 to 6), Tritos (Secondary - 7 to 10) and Eschatos (Senior Secondary - 11 and 12). As of curricular year 2022–23, there are 10 classes in each of 3, 4, and 5; 9 classes in 6; and 8 classes in each of 7, 8, 9, and 10: giving a total of nearly 2120 students in just the Deuteros and Tritos blocks. The students are divided into four houses, each represented after a mythical creature.
Dragon: Veritas vos libera bit. (Lat.: The truth will set you free.)
Phoenix: Per ardua ad astra. (Lat.: Through struggle to the stars.)
Gryphon: Fortes fortuna adiuvat. (Lat.: Fortune, goddess of luck, favors the brave.)
Unicorn: Honor virtutis praemium. (Lat.: Honour is the reward of virtue.)
Interhouse competitions are often held, for example, a Garba (Gujarati Folk Dance) Competition and a Rangoli Competition.

=== DPS Gurugram Sushant Lok ===
Set in the heart of Gurugram on a 5-acre campus, Delhi Public School Sushant Lok was commissioned in April 2005 under the leadership of Ms Meenakshi Singh, educationist and Mr N.K Singh, academician, Indian economist, policymaker and parliamentarian. Established under the aegis of Delhi Public School, Society, it has been recognized by the Directorate of Education, Haryana with affiliation to the Central Board of Secondary Education.

=== DPS Udaipur ===
Delhi Public School, Udaipur, is located a short distance from Udaipur City centre in the Aravali hills. The school offers day boarding and full boarding facilities in a 22-acre (89,000 m^{2}) campus. It was established on 25 April 2007.

=== DPS Vadodara ===
The school was started in April 2003 at Kalali in Vadodara. The campus is 3,00,000 sq. ft. The school produced the All-India CBSE Humanities topper Astha Sethi in 2012. The school opened another branch in the green suburb of Harni in Vadodara. The school is headed by Principal Dr. A. K. Sinha.

=== DPS Vasant Kunj ===
Delhi Public School Vasant Kunj was established in 1991 by the DPS Society. It is one of the 11 "Core Schools" under the direct management of the DPS Society. The founding principal is Vinay Kumar. DPS VK has a staff of 205 teachers at the senior and junior level and enrolled with 4,000 pupils.

=== DPS Vidyut Nagar ===
Delhi Public School NTPC Vidyut Nagar was established in 1988 by the DPS Society. DPS VN has a staff of 100 teachers at the senior and junior level and enrolled with 1,500 pupils.

=== DPS Vijaipur ===
DPS Vijaipur is a co-educational school. It was founded by the Fertilizer Minister Shri. R. Prabhu in 1985. The school is within the premises of National Fertilizers Limited.

=== DPS Vijayapura (Bijapur), Karnataka ===
Delhi Public School
- Vijayapura (Bijapur), Karnataka; India

Information
- Type: Private
- Motto: Service Before Self
- Established: 2021
- Officiating Principal: Neetan Thakur
- Grades: Nursery - VII
- Website: www.dpsvijayapura.com

Delhi Public School Vijayapura ( Bijapur) have a Campus area of 32,374 sq. m. with well equipped Modern Infrastructure. The school is in collaboration between Delhi Public School Society and the Daksha Educational Trust Society. The school is situated at Shirdi Sai Nagar, Atalatti road Bijapur-586125,Karnataka state of India. The School City office located at Yogeshwari Plaza, first Floor, F2 Block, New Vithal Mandir Road, Bijapur-586101.Delhi Public School, Vijayapura has affiliation with the Central Board of Secondary Education, based in New Delhi

=== DPS Visakhapatnam ===
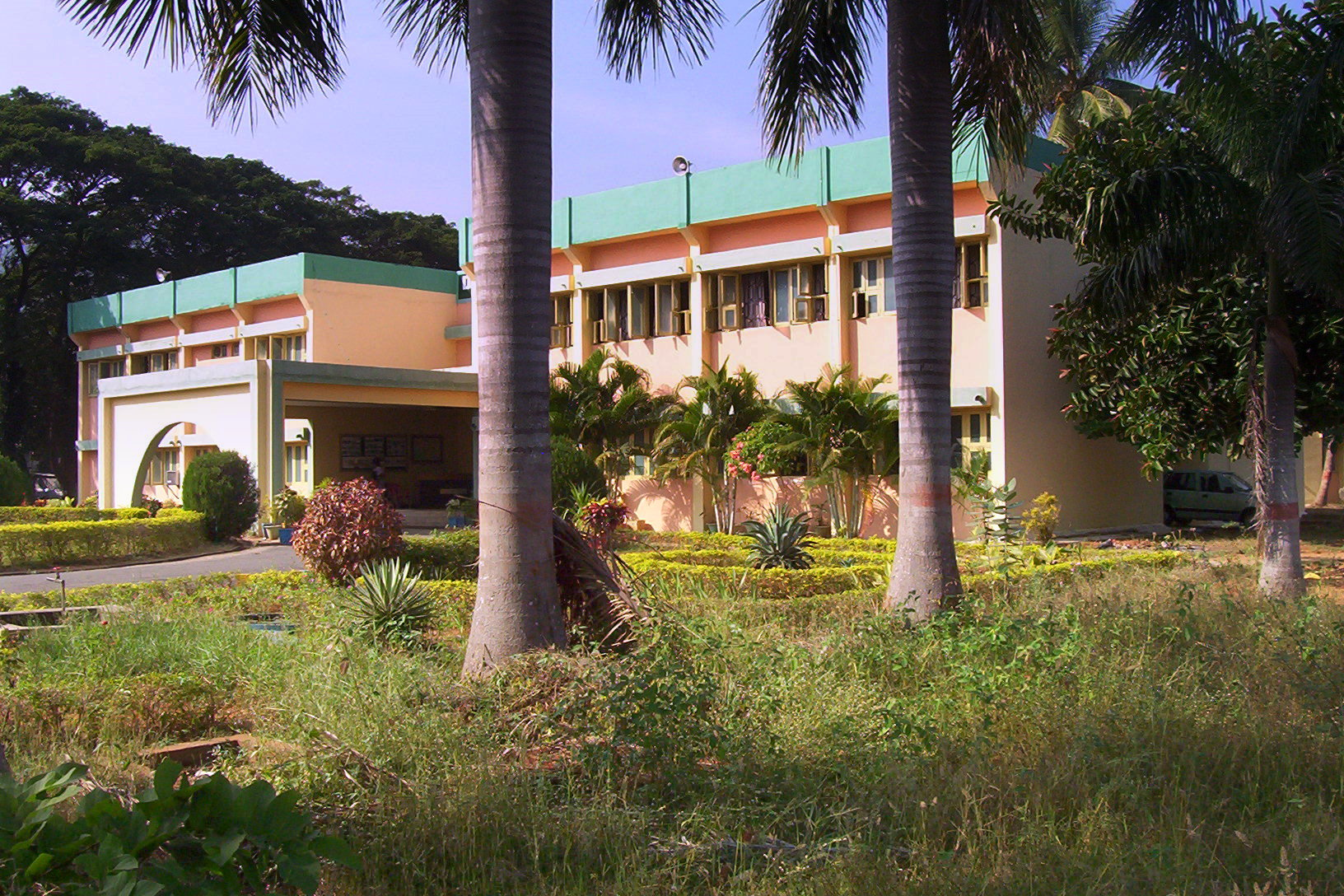
Delhi Public School, Visakhapatnam

Delhi Public School Visakhapatnam came into existence in 1992, as a response to Visakhapatnam Steel Plant's request to provide education to the children of its employees. It is located in Ukkunagaram.

=== DPS Vijayawada ===
It is located at Nidamanuru, Vijayawada, Andhra Pradesh.

=== DPS Yamuna Nagar, Haryana ===
DPS Yamuna Nagar was established in 2007. It is located near Bhambholi village 8 km from the city Jagadhri and 13 km from Yamuna Nagar.

=== DPS Vindhyanagar ===
The foundations of Delhi Public School, Vindhyanagar were laid in 1986 in collaboration with the public sector enterprise NTPC Ltd. It is a non-residential co-educational institution located in the township of Vindhyanagar, Madhya Pradesh. The school has around 2,200 pupils and 120 teaching and non-teaching staff.

=== DPS Varanasi ===
DPS Varanasi, situated in the "holy city" of Varanasi, was established in 2003. It is spread over 8 acres (32,000 m^{2}) of land. It is located on the NH-2 and a 30-minute drive from the holy city of Varanasi.

=== DPS Kalinga ===
Delhi Public School Kalinga was established in 2003 by the Delhi Public School Society and the Vidya Jyoti Trust. The school is under the aegis of and is managed by the Delhi Public School Society. DPS Kalinga is a part of the DPS society. It is located on the outskirts of the twin cities Cuttack and Bhubaneswar at Dist-Cuttack, Odisha. It provides schooling from classes Nursery to Class XII. It is a recognised by the British Council. The school has registered in NCC, Scouts and Guides, etc. and has dedicated trainers. It has more than 3,000 pupils.

=== DPS Nagpur Road Jabalpur (Madhya Pradesh) ===
The Delhi Public School, Nagpur Road, Jabalpur, is a member of the Delhi Public School Society. Delhi Public School, Nagpur Road, Jabapur, is promoted by the Raghuvanshi Foundation, which is a non-profit organization registered under the Indian Trust Act. Since its inception in 1996, DPS Nagpur Road, Jabalpur is a co-educational, English-medium school affiliated to C.B.S.E, New Delhi.

=== DPS Jamnagar ===
Delhi Public School Jamnagar is part of the DPS Society. The co-educational English-medium CBSE Pattern School launched its first academic year from April 2015. The School is located on Jamnagar Reliance Highway in Jamnagar.

=== DPS Daulatpur ===
DPS Daulatpur Haridwar is an initiative by the DPS Society. The School follows the CCE pattern of education of the Central Board of Secondary Education (CBSE).

=== DPS Kashi ===
DPS Kashi was established in 2005 in Varanasi. Its campus occupies 10 acres. The school is affiliated to CBSE (10+2, New Delhi)

=== DPS Warangal ===
Established in 2014, under the aegis of DPS Society, it follows the Central Board of Secondary Education (CBSE) system, and has both residential and day school facilities. The school is spread over 12 acres, making it the second largest DPS campus in India, and has a number of science and robotics labs, dedicated to the advancement of STEM subjects, in addition to a number of clubs for visual arts, music, and a half Olympic size swimming pool, too. Founded by the educationist Ravi Kiran Reddy. V, and his father, the school serves the tri-city area of Warangal, Kazipet, and Hanamkonda. The school offers classes starting from Nursery to Class VII for both boys and girls, and functions as a co-ed school.

=== Delhi Public School, Hanamkonda ===
Another branch of the DPS Warangal school, the primary school located in Hanamkonda serves the city with its school facilities for Nursery to Primary classes. It's a co-ed school, following the CBSE curriculum.

== Overseas ==
As of October 2024, the DPS Society operates 5 schools outside India in five countries. This list of authorized schools outside India is as follows:

1. Fahaheel Al-Watanieh Indian Private School (Kuwait)
2. DPS BPKIHS, Dharan (Nepal)
3. DPS Modern Indian School, Doha (Qatar)
4. Al Falah International School DPS, Jeddah (Saudi Arabia)
5. DPS, Ajman (United Arab Emirates)

=== Kuwait ===
Fahaheel Al-Watanieh Indian Private School or DPS Kuwait is an educational institution in Kuwait established on 11 September 1995. Its the first School Affiliated to Delhi Public School Society in the gulf. The school is affiliated to the Central Board of Secondary Education. The medium of instruction is English. At the class XI and XII level, the school offers a choice of three streams – Science, Commerce and Humanities. It is led by their principal Mr. Ravi Ayanoli.

=== Nepal ===
Delhi Public School, Dharan or B.P Koirala Institute of Health Science (BPKIHS) is a school in Dharan, Nepal, run under the aegis of Delhi Public School Society. It was established in 1996.

=== Qatar ===
Delhi Public School - Qatar, also known as DPS-MIS (MIS stands for "Modern Indian School") is an Indian school in Doha. It is affiliated to the CBSE board and follows the NCERT syllabus. It also has Physics Wallah as an option. The pupils are divided among four houses: Lotus, Lily, Rose and Tulip. The school takes part in the Annual Model United Nations. The school is led by its principal Ms Asna Nafees.

=== Saudi Arabia ===
Delhi Public School, Jeddah is in Saudi Arabia. It was established in 2004 and located in the Jeddah province.

=== United Arab Emirates ===
Delhi Private School, Ajman, is the only Official DPS in the United Arab Emirates. Opened in 2017 in the Ajman Province.
