= List of schools in Kuwait =

Below is a list of notable primary schools and secondary schools in the Asian country of Kuwait. Tertiary schools are listed at the list of universities in Kuwait.

Most schools in Kuwait are public schools which educate in the Arabic language. There are, however, a few schools which run under Indian Central Board of Secondary Education, British, American and French systems, or a combination of languages.

== American schools ==
- American International School of Kuwait
- American School of Kuwait

== British schools ==
- Gulf English School of Kuwait
- Kuwait English School
- New English School

== Indian schools ==
- Carmel School – Khaitan
- Fahaheel Al-Watanieh Indian Private School – Al Ahmadi

== Special-needs schools ==
- Al-Nibras School for Special Needs

== See also ==
- Education in Kuwait
- Lists of schools
