= Baupur =

Baupur may refer to the following places in India:

- Baupur, Jalandhar, Punjab
- Baupur, Ludhiana, Punjab
