= Delhi Public School, Faridabad =

Location
- Sector 19, Mathura Road; Faridabad, Haryana; India; 28.4211°N 77.3078°E

Information
- Established: 1995
- Principal: Sangeeta Chakravarty
- Area: 32,001 sq. m.
- Sports: Football, cricket, basketball, badminton, volleyball, tennis, kabbadi, kho-kho
- School fees: ₹ 10,000+
- Website: Official website

Delhi Public School, Faridabad is a school in Sector 19, Faridabad, Haryana, India. It was founded on 10 July 1995.

== History ==
DPS Faridabad was founded by Shri U.S. Verma in 1995 at Sector 19, Faridabad. Its current principal is Ms. Sangeeta Chakravarty. It is also considered as one of the best schools in Faridabad.

== Infrastructure ==
DPS Faridabad covers an area of 8 acres (32,001m^{2}) and includes a hostel, a playing field, a canteen, an auditorium, gardens, and a school building. The school has an SIS (student information system) Department for effective digital information and communication. The school is currently under reconstruction, with many new facilities being added for the betterment of the students. The school has installed a solar power plant on its rooftop to meet all of its power requirements and even supplies electricity to the Haryana Government.

The school currently enrolls over 4000 students as day scholars and hostelers and conducts classes from preschool to senior secondary level.

It also conducts a social responsibility programme called DPS Shiksha Kendra for underprivileged children, providing them with equipment such as books, stationery and uniforms as well as education. It is managed by Delhi Public School Society.

The school has partenered with a Bangalore-based company for their app Northstar to ensure child safety by tracking their movement to and from school. All transports are highly equipped with CCTV cameras for surveillance.

Recently, a space observatory has been built atop the school building for Astronomical and Educational purposes, under the success of the Chandrayaan-3 moon mission programme. The observatory, known as SOAR (Space Observation and Research Centre), is managed by Space Indi, and has a telescope, computers (for processing images), and other equipment. The school has introduced astronomy classes which take use of the observatory.

DPS Faridabad introduced a new 'micro-school' in 2021, which follows the Cambridge Educational Curriculum. It has over 300 students, and has a democratically elected student council system.

== Sports ==
DPS Faridabad participates in regional athletics competitions. Many students have achieved national or international medals in athletic competitions.

== Notable alumni ==
- CarryMinati, YouTuber and influencer
- Rahul Dalal, cricketer
- Ali Saad, polymath

== Court case ==
The case Delhi Public School, Faridabad vs State of Haryana and Others on 22 April 2015 resulted in the reinstatement of the falsely charged principal Anil Kumar after a period of eight years.

== See also ==
- List of schools under the aegis of the Delhi Public School Society
