= Al-Nibras School for Special Needs =

Al-Nibras Ideal School for Special Needs

Location
- block 4, St 200, Al Farwaniyah Governorate; Jleeb Al-Shuyoukh, Farwaniyah Governorate; Kuwait

Information
- School type: Private school
- Motto: "Everyone has the right to success"
- Established: September 2004 (21 years ago)
- Founder: Nora Al Dahery
- Age range: 4–21
- Enrollment: 250
- Language: Arabic
- Classrooms: 8
- Campus type: Urban
- Website: nis.edu.kw

Al-Nibras Ideal School is a school founded in September 2004 to cater to the needs of 4- to 21-year-old children with mild to moderate intellectual disability.

The school offers all its services in the Arabic language using the Kuwaiti dialect. The school offers speech therapy, physical therapy, occupational therapy, social worker, counselor, nurse and monthly medical checkups.

== See also ==
- Education in Kuwait
- List of schools in Kuwait
