= Alaur =

- village
- Location in Punjab, India Alaur (India)
- Coordinates: 30°41′33.28″N 76°14′46.39″E
- Country: India
- State: Punjab
- District: Ludhiana

Population (2011)
  - Total: 1,632

Languages
  - Official: Punjabi
  - Regional: Punjabi
- Time zone: UTC+5:30 (IST)

Alaur is a village located in Khanna tehsil, in the Ludhiana district of Punjab, India. The total population of the village is about 1,632.
