= Asgaripur =

- village
- Location in Punjab, India Asgaripur (India)
- Coordinates: 30°44′31″N 76°5′38″E
- Country: India
- State: Punjab
- District: Ludhiana

Population (2011)
  - Total: 188

Languages
  - Official: Punjabi
  - Regional: Punjabi
- Time zone: UTC+5:30 (IST)
- PIN: 141410

Asgaripur is a village located in Khanna tehsil, in the Ludhiana district of Punjab, India. The total population of the village is about 188.
