= Bahu Majra =

Baho Majra
- village
- Location in Punjab, India Baho Majra (India)
- Coordinates: 30°43′1″N 76°10′58″E
- Country: India
- State: Punjab
- District: Ludhiana

Population (2010)
  - Total: 1,268

Languages
  - Official: Punjabi
  - Regional: Punjabi
- Time zone: UTC+5:30 (IST)

Baho Majra is a village located in Khanna tehsil, in the Ludhiana district of Punjab, India. The total population of the village is about 1,268.
