= Azerbaijan women's national kabaddi team =

Azerbaijan women's national kabaddi team represents Azerbaijan in women's kabaddi events.

== Tournament history ==
=== 2014 Kabaddi World Cup, group stage ===
==== Pool A ====
Team	Pld	W	D	L	SF	SA	SD	Pts
India	3	3	0	0	153	47	106	6
Denmark	3	2	0	1	100	99	1	4
Azerbaijan	3	1	0	2	71	119	-48	2
United States	3	0	0	3	79	138	-59	0

Qualified for semifinals

10 December 2014
12:30

Azerbaijan	17 - 40	Denmark

A.S. College Stadium, Khanna, Ludhiana

15 December 2014
11:05

Azerbaijan	38 - 32	United States

Punjab Public School, Nabha
