= Rauni =

Rauni may mean:

- Rauni (deity), a figure in Finnish mythology
- Rauni, Ludhiana, a village in the Ludhiana (malwa) district of Punjab state, India
- Rauni Khurd, Roopnagar, a village in the Roopnagar (Puaad) district of Punjab state, India
