= J. D. Tytler =

Scottish-Indian educationalist

James Douglas Tytler
- Born: 31 March 1898; Scotland
- Died: 13 September 1973 (aged 75); New Delhi, India
- Citizenship: United Kingdom (former); India
- Occupation: Educationist
- Organization(s): Delhi Public School, J. D. Tytler School
- Known for: Founding Delhi Public School and other schools

Rev. James Douglas Tytler, commonly referred to as J. D. Tytler, (31 March 1898 – 13 September 1973) was a Scottish-Indian educationist. He founded the Delhi Public School, Mathura Road in New Delhi (which would later expand into the Delhi Public School Society), and several other schools. Peter Tytler was his first son, and Jagdish Tytler, the politician and former Union minister, is his adopted son.

== Early life ==
J. D. Tytler was born in Scotland on 31 March 1898. He arrived in India as Chaplain to the Viceroy attached to the Cathedral Church of the Redemption in New Delhi. He "fell in love with India" and never went back, taking up Indian citizenship. He brought up Jagdish (born 1944), who had arrived in Delhi as a child following the Partition of India.

== Career as educationist ==
=== Early efforts ===
J. D. Tytler's role in school education began in 1941, when he started the New Delhi Church High School within the premises of Cathedral Church of the Redemption, with a handful of students. The school attracted some experienced teachers from other schools. His associate R. D. Banerjee recounts: "December 1940 – The annual Scouts’ Masters’ Training Camp was held near Humayun's Tomb ...Rev. Tytler and myself were called upon to help the trainees. J.D and myself were camp mates. ... we talked late into the night. J.D. confided, “Banerjee, I shell be retiring soon, but I will not go back ... I have planned to start a school. Yet there is a ‘BUT’ in it. I do not have enough funds to invest. Could you suggest a way out?” Tytler accepted Banerjee's suggestion to start in tents pitched inside the church compound. In 1946, Banerjee and several other experienced teachers from Presentation Convent School joined the new school.

In 1947, the association of the school with the church ended. According to Suman Narain, one of the earliest students to graduate from the school, this was due to a "disagreement between the Church authorities and the Rev. Tytler". The school moved out of the church compound to a temporary location just outside it, on North Avenue, and was renamed Naveen Bharat School. The name, meaning New India, was suggestive of a new beginning in a newly independent country. Meanwhile, Tytler had applied to the Delhi Administration to be allotted land for the school, but his request was not granted since the school was not recognised by the Administration.

=== Delhi Public School ===
Ajay Kumar Sharma, who has written a history of educational institutions in Delhi, regards the Delhi Public School Society as "the most important school or society of the post-Partition period". Of the developments leading to its formation, he writes: "Tytler, who was an influential personality in Delhi, was able to garner support from the officials and the public". The new Director of Education, L. R. Sethi, suggested that a new society be formed and the old school be wound up. A new society, the Delhi Public School Society, was set up with Tytler as one of the ten members. The new school, to be called Delhi Public School, was put on the list of recognised schools, and land was allotted to it. Finally, in 1949, Delhi Public School began functioning from its present location on Mathura Road. J. D. Tytler was its first Principal (1949–1952). D. Kapilash, a teacher during that period, has this recollection of Tytler: "We had about 500 boys and girls on the rolls. He knew each and every child. Children really loved him and he in turn got their undivided love. The little ones ran after him. He picked them up and gave them a piggy ride. You could see the kids holding his hands, clinging on his legs or sitting on his shoulders and holding each finger of his hand. ... It was a real pleasure working with Mr. Tytler. He not only loved the children but also cared for and respected the teachers."

Tytler's efforts got a big boost in 1951, when Chester Bowles, the American ambassador to India, decided to send his three children to the newly established Delhi Public School. One of them, Cynthia, wrote her memoirs after returning to the US. Of the school, she writes, "It was co-educational and conveniently located, about two miles away from our home. The classes were conducted in tents, which would be put up and taken down as the enrollment of the students fluctuated. ... At the time we entered Delhi Public, the teachers and all of the thirteen hundred students were Indians, with the exception of a wonderful family of Indonesian children". She recalls Tytler as being "alternately pleasant and impressively stern".

In 1952, Tytler resigned from the post of Principal and his association with Delhi Public School came to an end. The expansion of the DPS system, into what has become one of India's largest chains of private schools, began in his lifetime, in 1972.

=== Other schools ===
In the early 1950s, the development of residential areas in South Delhi had just begun. A private developer involved in the project requested J. D. Tytler to set up a school in South Delhi. In response to this request, Tytler started Summer Fields School in Kailash Colony, New Delhi, in 1953. He was the first principal of the school and his adopted son Jagdish one of its first students.

In 1954, Tytler founded the school that still bears his name – J. D. Tytler School, New Delhi. Unlike with other schools he founded, in this case he retained his close connection with the school, remaining the principal until his death in 1973. An innovation that was introduced in this school was the grading system, which has become fairly common by now. The school continues to pay tribute to him on his death anniversary.

=== Legacy as educator ===
Although himself a Christian cleric, Tytler was, arguably, responsible for the growth of the idea of a non-denominational private school in Delhi. Through the expansion of the DPS chain, the idea also spread to other parts of India. Additionally, an aspect of school education on which Tytler laid great emphasis was the integration of sports into the programme of schooling – something which is now taken for granted by leading private schools in India.

== Other contributions ==
Tytler was, in the words of the J. D. Tytler school website, "a man of many talents – an educationist, a sportsman, a dynamic organizer, an incurable optimist with a wry sense of humor, dramatist, actor and a well – known patron of the arts and music ..." He played a major role in the organisation of several sports in Delhi, including swimming, weightlifting, cycling and gymnastics. His readiness to help organisers of sporting events earned him the sobriquet of "good Samaritan of Delhi sport". A badminton tournament at the state level is named after him. The National Federation Cup Judo Championship 2002 was dedicated to his memory.

Tytler was an important figure in theatre in the city, as an actor and organiser. He acted in the Merchant-Ivory film Shakespeare Wallah. The credits of the film show his name as Jim Tytler, which is how he was referred to in the world of theatre. He was profiled as a theatre person in a 1961 book by Rekha Menon. The author thought of him as primarily an actor, and wrote (amusingly): "When Jim Tytler is not acting in plays, he is founding schools, of which he has founded quite a few..." He was a founder-member of Delhi Music Society, an organisation set up in 1953 to promote Western classical music. He was also one of the Vice-Presidents of the All India Fine Arts and Crafts Society.
