= Baupur, Punjab =

Baupur
- village
- Location in Punjab, India Baupur (India)
- Coordinates: 30°36′30.05″N 76°6′6.39″E
- Country: India
- State: Punjab
- District: Ludhiana

Population (2011)
  - Total: 290

Languages
  - Official: Punjabi
  - Regional: Punjabi
- Time zone: UTC+5:30 (IST)

Baupur is a village located in Khanna tehsil, in the Ludhiana district of Punjab, India. The total population of the village is about 290.
