= Education in Kuwait =

Ministry of Education

National education budget (2022)
- Budget: $7.33 billion (4.0% of GDP) (public only)

General details
- Primary languages: Arabic
- System type: Public and private

Literacy
- Male: 97%
- Female: 96%

Enrollment
- Total: 658,868
- Primary: 345,501
- Secondary: 313,367

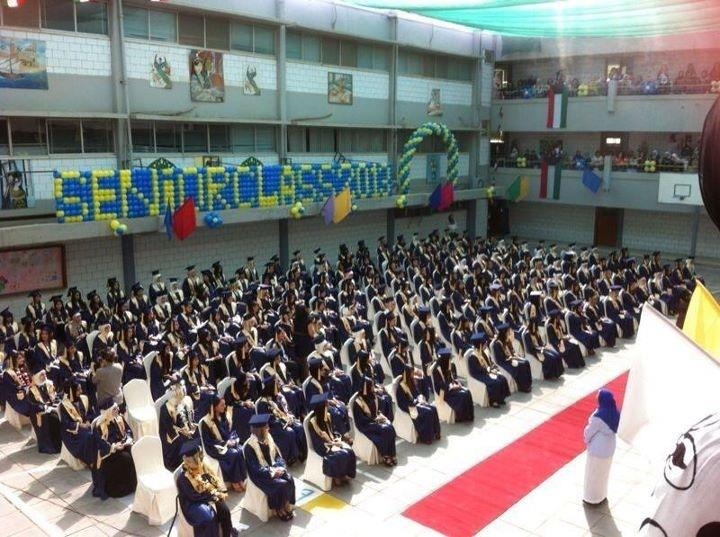
Fajer Al-sabah School 2013 graduation

The State of Kuwait, located at the head of the Persian Gulf, supports an educational policy that seeks to provide an opportunity to all children, irrespective of their social class, including children with special needs. Kuwait was ranked 63rd on the Human Development Index report for 2011 by the United Nations Development Programme, placing Kuwait above the regional average.

According to 2017 data from UNESCO, the literacy rate stood at 96.3% for Kuwaitis aged 25–64, compared to 80% across the MENA region. In 2017 99.9% of Kuwaitis aged, 15–24 were literate, while the MENA average was 89.6% in 2016. Moreover, according to World Bank statistics from 2015, among Kuwaitis 15 and older, females have caught up to and surpassed their male peers on this metric of educational attainment, which stands, for the respective sexes, at 99.4% and 96.4%.

The education system in Kuwait has celebrated numerous achievements on a global scale; in the year ending 2006, thirteen percent of all public expenditure was given to education, comparable to many OECD countries. As a percentage of GDP, at 15 percent, Kuwait is currently above the OECD average.

Kuwait has the highest literacy rate in the Arab world. In 2005, the literacy rate of Kuwait was 94 percent. The Ministry of Education is also making efforts to incorporate women into the educated workforce through various programs; for instance, the 1989 initiative to establish daytime literacy clinics for women. The Kuwaiti government offers scholarships to students who are accepted in universities in the United States, the United Kingdom and other foreign academic institutions.

== History of education in Kuwait ==
Kuwait is one of the high-income countries with a GDP per capita of above $24,000. Oil exports account for nearly half of Kuwait's national income and about 80% of government revenues. Between 1975 and 1985, the proportion of all working nationals employed in the public sector, including oil, rose from 76 percent to 92 percent. The government of Kuwait is now looking for alternative ways to stimulate employment and the generation of income. With this in mind, it is keen to diversify and improve the skills of its labor force; hence the high priority is given to the reform of education at all levels.

At the beginning of the 20th century, there was no formal educational system in place in Kuwait at all. There were a few Quranic schools, known as Al-Katatib, funded by the wealthy private citizens of Kuwait, that taught reading, writing, and basic arithmetic. In 1911, the Al Mubarakiyya School was established as one of Kuwait's modern educational institutions. It was founded by merchants to train their clerks in commerce, arithmetic, and letter-writing skills. In 1921, the Al-Ahmedia school was established, which offered English courses, and soon thereafter, an all-girls school was founded that provided education in Arabic, home economics and Islamic Studies. The government became involved in providing formal education in 1936, and by 1945 there were 17 schools in Kuwait. With the increase in oil production and hence state revenues after World War II, the government began investing huge sums of money into social services, including education. By 1960, there were 45,000 students enrolled in Kuwait's educational system, including 18,000 girls.

In 1965, following the constitution that made education a fundamental right of a citizen, education was made compulsory for children aged between 6 and 14. Since the early 21st century, the Ministry of Education has sought to prepare a general, long-term education strategy, focusing on educational teaching for the years up to 2025. This effort aims to align teaching methodologies with the current needs of an increasingly globalised world. The World Bank is conducting an analytical study to explore the various policy options needed to implement this new strategy.

A National Conference for the Development of Education was held in Kuwait in February 2008, to discuss this national strategy further. Other multilateral organizations, such as the OECD, are working towards improving the business environment in Kuwait and providing training for women to promote female entrepreneurship within the country.

== Demographics ==
The population of Kuwait has grown rapidly in recent times, more than doubling between 1985 and 2005. Kuwaitis born in the country now make up about a third of the country's population. Expatriates make up the rest. The school-aged population of both Kuwaitis and non-Kuwaitis represented 24 percent of the total population in 2005. There were 716,000 people aged between 4 and 21 years old in Kuwait that year, of which 426,000 were Kuwaitis (representing 60 percent) and about 290,000, non–Kuwaitis. There are more males than females in every age group of the school-age population. The proportion of non-Kuwaitis is slightly higher among the 18- to 21-year-olds.

In 2007, the female enrollment at primary and secondary level was 97 and 91 percent respectively, and for males, the corresponding figures were 99 and 90 percent. At the same time, a burgeoning young population is posing a burden on the job market, with rising numbers of young people unemployed. "The Government is looking at wider economic reform, including moving some of the 95 percent of Kuwaitis who work in the state sector to the private sector", to increase job opportunities for the new entrants.

== Levels of education ==
=== School education ===
The general education system consists of four levels: kindergarten, or nursery (lasting for 2 years), primary (lasting for 5 years), intermediate (lasting for 4 years), and secondary (lasting for 3 years). Schooling at the primary and intermediate level is compulsory for all students aged 6 – 14. All the levels of state education, including higher education, are free. There are two main ministries involved in the development of the education sector: the Ministry of Education and the Ministry of Higher Education.

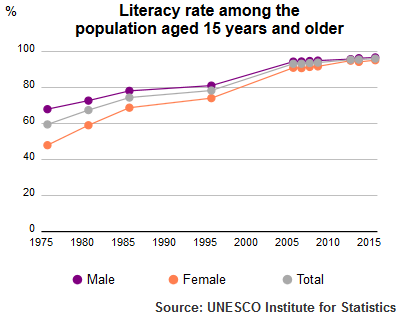
UIS Literacy Rate Kuwait population plus15 1975 2015

There are about 1,145 schools in Kuwait, at all levels from kindergarten to secondary (2006 figures). Out of this total, 664 are public and 481 are private schools. There are 6 districts in Kuwait.

Two-thirds of all students (from kindergarten to secondary) were in public schools during the year ending 2006. Most Kuwaitis study in public schools, typically with Arabic curriculum. The private schools are split about equally between Arabic medium schools, which follow Kuwait's national curriculum, and foreign language schools, which follow other curricula (e.g., American, British, French, International Baccalaureate, and Indian). There are currently 591,359 students enrolled in Kuwait's schools which makes up approximately 20 percent of the entire population.

Between 2003 and 2006 there was a substantial increase in the growth of teachers, compared to the growth in students, especially at the primary level. In the year ending 2006, there was an increase of 21 percent in primary school teachers despite a decrease in student enrollments. A large proportion of public school teachers are Kuwaiti females, particularly at the primary level. Only 4 percent of women teachers are older than 45 years, compared to 35 percent of non-Kuwaiti males.

In a recent development in Kuwait, the Civil Service Commission (CSC) has released data that indicates an annual increase in the number of unemployed Kuwaitis. This upswing accompanies a rise in university graduates, particularly from fields that do not meet the current demand in the labor market. The mismatch between the obtained skills from these specific fields and the requirements of the job market is a significant concern. Factors such as inadequate focus on the private sector and insufficient coordination among relevant authorities also contribute to this issue. Unless there are substantial improvements in the quality of educational outputs, the number of graduates from less-demanded fields will likely continue to increase. As of November 19, 2023, the Central Statistics Bureau has officially declared that the number of unemployed Kuwaitis reached 8,727. Among them, approximately 48 percent were males (4,177), and 52 percent were females (4,550).

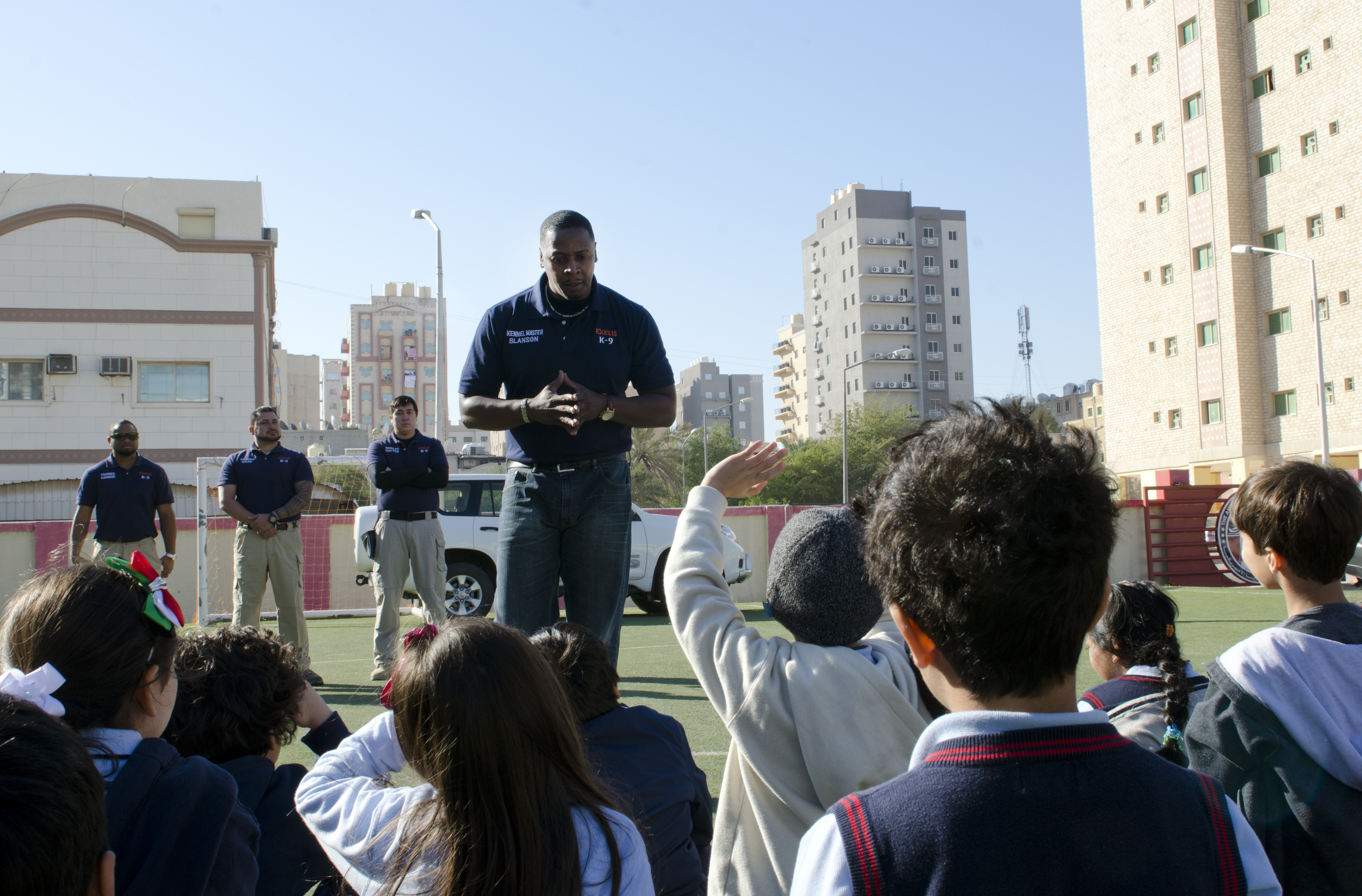
Third grade students at the American Baccalaureate School in Abraq Khaitan, Kuwait, 2010

=== Nursery and primary education ===
In Kuwait, schooling usually begins at age six. Pre-school or nursery education is also available to children from four to six years old. Under a new system, primary education will begin at age 5 years.

The first nursery school in Kuwait was established by a Palestinian emigrant Salwa Abu Khadra. There is the option of attending one of the private schools, which have foreign sponsors and mostly offer co-education, whereas the Kuwaiti public schools are segregated by gender starting at the primary levels. Examples of private foreign schools in Kuwait are the Kuwait Bilingual School (KBS), British School of Kuwait (BSK), Bayan Bilingual School, the American School of Kuwait, the New English School (Kuwait), the American International School of Kuwait, the Kuwait English School, the French School, and the Canadian School of Kuwait (CSK). Private schools are not subsidised by the state. In 2007, the primary gross enrollment rate was 98.5 percent. The gender parity index, which is the ratio of female enrollment to male enrollment, was 0.98. This shows parity in gender for the enrollment at the primary level. The percentage of Kuwaitis studying in private schools in kindergarten is 20 percent.

The Kuwaiti government puts about KD5.6 million per annum into private educational facilities, in addition to allocating land for school construction and paying for the distribution of books. The Kuwait government also ensures that each school is equipped with a library. The government has focused on expanding the collection of books from 230,000 to 3 million today. The government is also promoting the use of information technology at the school level. The launch of the 'Education Net' project is a manifestation of that, as it connects every government school and library in Kuwait to a telecommunications data network.

=== Intermediate and secondary education ===
Students are required to spend 4 years at the intermediate level, up to grade 9, after which they move on to the secondary level. Secondary education is for 3 years, after which students can adopt the higher education track by entering university or gaining admission into a vocational college to study for technical or vocational qualifications. The secondary education system is now being standardized from the present academic and credit system to a single system. The application of this new organization started during the academic year 2006/07.

Enrollment rates at the secondary level have been rising since the year 2000, except for the period 2005/06, when the system changed from 4-4–4 years at each education level to 5-4–3 years, thus distorting the figures. The gender parity index of the secondary level gross enrollment rate in 2007 was 0.98, reflecting parity in gender at the secondary level. Now the focus of the Ministry of Education will be on improving the quality of the education system. Girls outperform boys in every subject of the 12th-grade examinations, particularly in philosophy, English, Arabic languages, chemistry, physics, mathematics, and biology. International indicators such as the Trends in International Mathematics and Science Study and Progress in International Reading Literacy Study are not very encouraging. Special attention is being given to reducing repetition and dropout rates.

The Ministry of Education in Kuwait is also trying to foster the use of information technology (ICT) in schools by including e-learning in the curriculum. For fourteen-year-olds in 2006, there were 13 students per computer on average in Kuwait's public schools. This is very similar to the OECD average, back in 2000, for 15-year-olds. Despite the availability of computers in schools and at home, there is no guarantee that computers will be used solely for learning, however, and the government may need to rethink the strategy of making technology accessible to a large number of students, whilst developing a curriculum that incorporates e-learning in most of the subjects.

The Ministry of Education in Kuwait is making efforts to provide equal educational opportunities by opening special needs institutes. In total there are 44 special needs schools out of which 33 are public schools and 11 are private schools. Some of the special needs children are also enrolled in special needs classes offered in general schools.

=== Vocational and technical education ===
Post-secondary technical and vocational education is offered by the Public Authority for Applied Education and Training (PAAET).

The Government of Kuwait is encouraging its citizens to opt for vocational training programs to fulfill the demand for a skilled workforce. Students enrolling for vocational training at PAAET can join programs after the primary, intermediate or secondary school, although the majority of students, about 70 percent, are enrolled having completed secondary level education. In 2005/06 there were 12,285 students enrolled in after-secondary training courses, of which 62 percent were female. The total number of students in vocational training at PAAET increased by 8 percent from the previous year to 17,459 students. The male enrollment decreased by 10 percent whereas the female enrollment increased by 42 percent. This substantial increase was due to the introduction of new vocational programs in line with the demands of the female students.

Post-secondary education includes courses at a PAAET technical college lasting for two and a half years, following which the students receive a certificate that is less than a tertiary diploma that does allow the graduates to enter the workforce.

=== Higher education ===
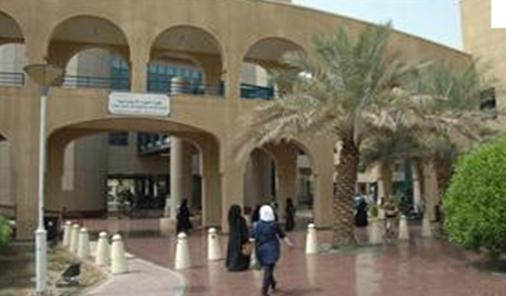
College of Social Sciences, Kuwait University, 2005

==== Public institutes ====
There are three state-supported higher education institutions in Kuwait.

- Kuwait University
- Higher Institute for Theater Arts
- Higher Institute of Music Arts

Kuwait University was established in 1966. It is a co-educational institution and comprises five campuses in Kuwait City. Since its inception, the number of students has increased considerably, from 400 at its inception to 19,711 in 2005/06. It offers a wide range of academic courses.

==== Private universities ====
There are many private universities in Kuwait accredited by the Ministry of Higher Education – Private Universities Council, including:

- American University of Kuwait (AUK)
- Gulf University for Science and Technology (GUST)
- Kuwait-Maastricht Business School (KMBS)
- Box Hill College Kuwait (BHCK)
- American University of the Middle East (AUM)
- American College of the Middle East (ACM)
- Kuwait International Law School (KILAW)
- Algonquin Canadian College of Kuwait (AC-Kuwait)
- Arab Open University (AOU)
- Australian College of Kuwait (ACK)

A total of 20,537 undergraduate & post-graduate students were enrolled in the above private universities as per the first semester of academic year 2012–2013.
