= CarryMinati =

Indian YouTuber and streamer (born 1999)

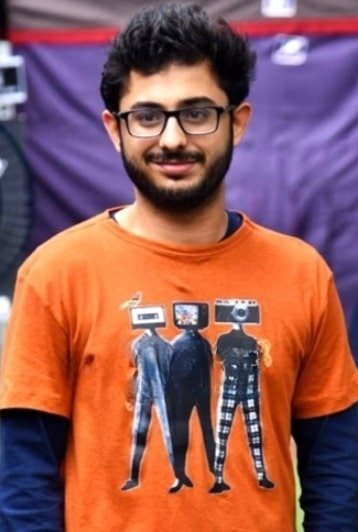
- Nagar in 2022
- Born: Ajey Nagar; 12 June 1999 (age 27); Faridabad, Haryana, India
- Other names: Carry; Ajey
- Education: Delhi Public School, Faridabad (2016)
- Occupations: YouTuber; Rapper; Singer; Songwriter
- Years active: 2014–present

YouTube information
- Channels: CarryMinati; CarryisLive; CarryMinati Productions Official; CarryMinati Shorts
- Genres: Comedy; gaming; commentary; satire; sketches; vlogs; Hip hop
- Subscribers: 45.2 million (main channel); 60 million (combined); (Note: Subscribers, broken down by channel: 45.2 million (CarryMinati) 12.2 million (CarryisLive) 1.1 million (CarryMinati Productions Official) 1.9 million (CarryMinati Shorts))
- Views: 4.3 billion (main channel); 7 billion (combined) (Note: Views, broken down by channel: 4.3 billion (CarryMinati) 1.69 billion (CarryisLive) 60 million (CarryMinati Productions Official) 941 million (CarryMinati Shorts))
- Last updated: 16 December 2025

Ajey Nagar (pronounced [əˈdʒeː ˈnaːɡər]; born 12 June 1999), better known as CarryMinati, is an Indian YouTuber, streamer and rapper. He is known for his roasting videos, comedic skits and reactions to various online topics on his channel CarryMinati. His other channel CarryisLive is dedicated to gaming and live streams. With over 45 million subscribers as of January 2026, he is one of the most-subscribed individual YouTubers in India. In May 2020, his roast video titled YouTube vs TikTok: The End caused controversy on YouTube. The video was removed by YouTube for violations against the platform's terms of service, citing reasons such as cyberbullying and harassment.

== Early life and education ==
Ajey Nagar was born on 12 June 1999 in Faridabad, India. He attended Delhi Public School, Faridabad and dropped out to pursue his YouTube career; skipping his Class-XII Board examination because of his nervousness about passing the economics exam. He later completed his schooling through long-distance learning.

Nagar's elder brother, Yash, is a music producer and composer who has collaborated with him as Wily Frenzy.

== Career ==
Ajey Nagar is based in Faridabad, a city near India's national capital New Delhi. Popularly referred to as CarryMinati, Nagar is mainly involved in creating Hindi-language roasting and comedy videos, diss songs, satirical parodies, apart from live gaming. Nagar and his team produce videos out of his home in Faridabad.

Nagar began posting videos on YouTube at the age of 10, uploading football tutorial videos on his first YouTube channel STeaLThFeArzZ. His main YouTube channel has been active since 2014. In 2014, the channel's name was AddictedA1 and Nagar would upload recorded video game footage along with his reactions to the game. In 2015, he changed the channel's name to CarryDeol, uploading gameplay footage of Counter-Strike: Global Offensive while mimicking Sunny Deol. The channel was subsequently renamed to CarryMinati. He became the first Indian YouTuber ever to surpass the milestone of 30 million subscribers in May, 2021 and 40 million subscribers in August, 2023. Beyond India, he also currently has the highest number of subscribers in the Asia region.

In early 2017, Nagar created an additional YouTube channel called CarryIsLive, where he live-streams himself playing video games. He has hosted live-streams on this channel, raising funds for victims of Kerala floods in 2018. cyclone Fani in Odisha, Assam floods, Bihar floods and Shaheed's of Pulwama attack in 2019, Bushfires in Australia, COVID’19 and the flooding in Assam and Bihar in 2020. On 4 June, Nagar hosted a four-hour charity live-stream for the victims of 2023 Odisha train collision. The live-stream generated INR 11,87,611.64 with ₹150,000 personal contributions; all the funds were donated to the Chief Minister's relief funds – Government of Odisha.

In January, 2023 Nagar created another YouTube channel CarryMinati Productions Official, where he uploads vlogs and behind the scenes videos.

=== Music ===
In January 2019, Nagar released a diss track called "Bye PewDiePie" in which he criticized PewDiePie and supported T-Series in the YouTube rivalry between the two, which garnered 22 million views within five months. In the same year he released another track, "Trigger" in a collaboration with his elder brother Wily Frenzy. This was followed by "Zindagi", "Warrior" and the diss track "Yalgaar" in 2020, and "Vardaan" in 2021. In 2020, Nagar also collaborated with music composer duo Salim–Sulaiman for the music video Date Kar Le. He released "Jalwa" in 2023.

=== Homophobic video incident ===
In May 2020, Nagar published a controversial YouTube video titled "YouTube Vs TikTok–The End", in response to a video shared on Instagram by TikTok user Amir Siddiqui who berated YouTube creators for roasting TikTok users. It was taken down by YouTube citing violations of its terms of service, based on multiple complaints of harassment and cyberbullying. A large number reports had been made by LGBTQ+ activists, on account of homophobic or transphobic abusive language in the video. Many of Nagar's fans were critical of YouTube's actions, and the removal led to several new trending hashtags mentioning his name. As a result, the video received several million views, and there was a concerted effort to review bomb TikTok at Google Play Store. Other fans of Nagar spoke out in favor of YouTube's decision to remove the video. In June 2020, Nagar uploaded the music video for his song "Yalgaar" as a further response, with renewed criticism of Siddiqui.

=== Legal issue ===
On February 9, 2026, a Mumbai court restrained Nagar, and his team from posting or circulating any defamatory or objectionable content against Indian filmmaker Karan Johar, who sued Nagar, with his plaintiff alleging that Nagar's recent video titled "Coffee With Jalan", was modeled around Johar's talk show Koffee with Karan, and used vulgar and abusive language towards him. The court also directed Meta Platforms, who was named as one of the defendants, to take down the videos and URL related to Johar, as his team alleged that clips of the original content are still circulating online, although the video has been taken down.

=== Other work ===
In year 2020, Nagar collaborated with music composer duo Salim–Sulaiman for the music video "Date Kar Le".

Nagar's song "Yalgaar" which was produced by Wily Frenzy, served as the theme song in 2021 film The Big Bull.

He had a cameo appearance as himself in the 2022 movie Runway 34.

In February 2023, Nagar bought a 10% stake in esports firm Big Bang Esports with business partner Deepak Char.

== In the media ==
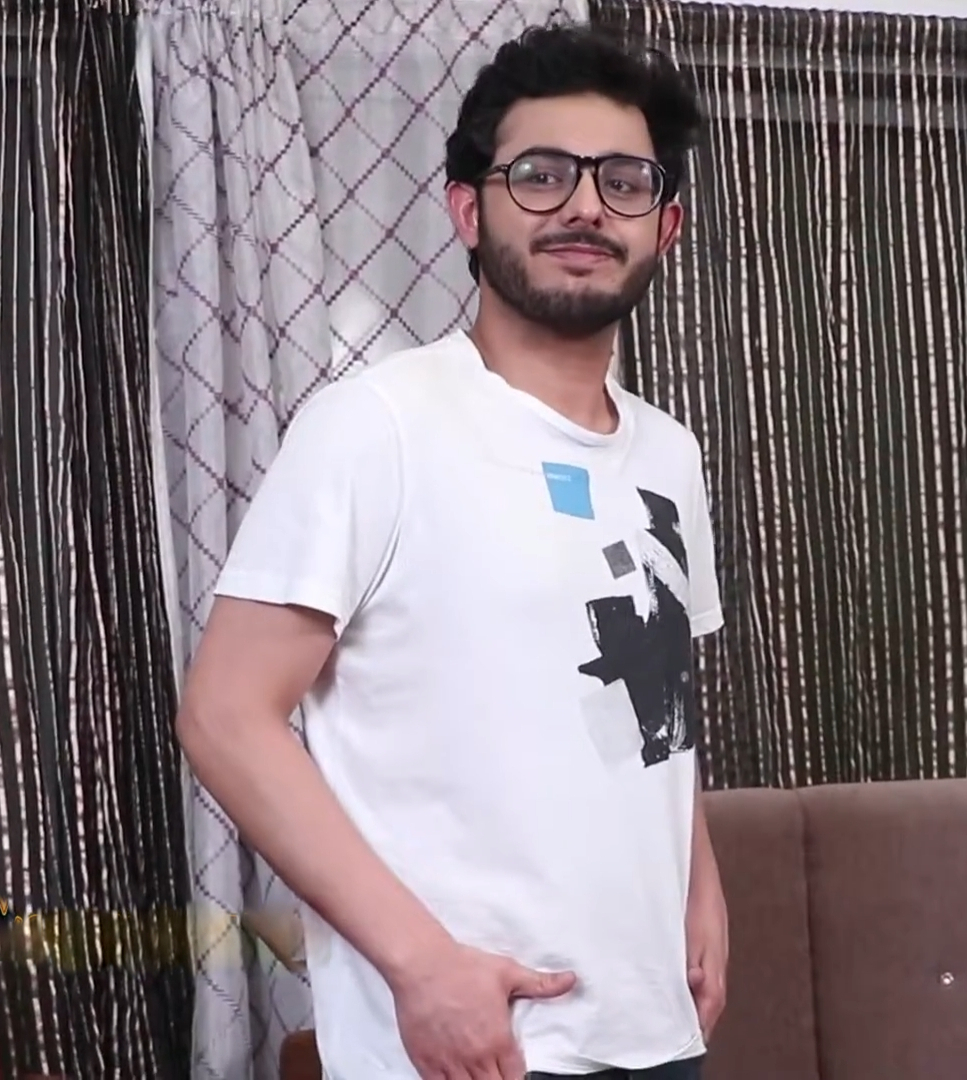
Nagar promoting the gaming show Playground, 2022

In 2019, Nagar was listed at the 10th position in the Next Generation Leaders' 2019 by Time magazine, which is an annual list of ten young people who construct innovative careers.

In April 2020, Nagar was featured in Forbes 30 Under 30 Asia list.

In 2021, Nagar was featured On the top 50 list of India Today's High & Mighty powerful personalities in India.

In March 2022, Nagar was featured in the Hindustan Times brunch cover story.

== Filmography ==
=== Films ===
Year	Title	Role	Notes	Ref.
2022	Runway 34	Himself	Cameo appearance	

=== Web series ===
Year	Title	Role	Notes	Ref.
2017	Press Start to Play	Ajey		
2021	Me Boss and Lockdown	Ajey/Rockstar		
2021	Dhindora	Himself	Special appearance in title track music video	
2022–2023	Playground	Mentor	2 seasons	

== Discography ==
=== Singles and collaborations ===
Year	Title	Artist(s)	Notes	Ref.
2019	Bye Pewdiepie	CarryMinati	Diss track	
2019	Trigger	CarryMinati, Vibgyor	Single	
2020	Zindagi	CarryMinati, Wily Frenzy	Single	
2020	Warrior	CarryMinati, Wily Frenzy	Single	
2020	Yalgaar	CarryMinati, Wily Frenzy	Remade in 2021 for the film The Big Bull	
2020	Date kar Le	CarryMinati, Romy, Salim–Sulaiman	Single	
2021	Vardaan	CarryMinati, Wily Frenzy	Single	
2023	Jalwa	CarryMinati, Wily Frenzy, Vartika Jha	Single	

== Awards and recognition ==
=== Awards ===
Year	Award	Category	Work	Result	Ref.
2022	Lokmat Stylish Awards	Most Stylish Youth Icon (Male)	—N/a	Won	
2023	Bollywood Hungama Style Icons	Most Stylish Digital Entertainer (Male)	—N/a	Nominated	
2024	Bollywood Hungama Style Icons	Most Stylish Digital Star of the Year	—N/a	Nominated	

=== Honours ===
- 2019 – Time's 10 Next Generation Leaders No. 10
- 2020 – Forbes 30 Under 30 Asia

== See also ==
- List of YouTubers
- List of Indian comedians
