= Ikolahi =

Ikolahi fatehpur
- village
- Location in Punjab, India Ikolahi (India)
- Coordinates: 30.703240°N 76.163611°E
- Country: India
- State: Punjab

Population (2011)
  - Total: 1,874

Languages
  - Official: Punjabi
- Time zone: UTC+5:30 (IST)
- Postal code: 141401

Ikolahi is a village in Khanna tehsil in Ludhiana district of Punjab State, India. It is located 39 km to the east of District headquarters Ludhiana. 7 km from Khanna. 68 km from State capital Chandigarh Ikolahi Pin code is 141401 and the postal head office is Khanna. Libra (2 km), Bhamadi (2 km), Daudpur (2 km), Rasulra (2 km), and Chakohi (3 km) are the nearby villages to Ikolahi.

== Caste Factor ==
In Ikolahi village, most of the villagers are from Jatt caste. Schedule Caste (SC) constitutes 41.36% of total population in Ikolahi village.

== Work Profile ==
In Ikolahi village out of total population, 732 were engaged in work activities. 90.71% of workers describe their work as Main Work (Employment or Earning more than 6 Months) while 9.29% were involved in Marginal activity providing livelihood for less than 6 months. Of 732 workers engaged in Main Work, 147 were cultivators (owner or co-owner) while 50 were Agricultural labourer.

== Population ==
The Ikolahi village has population of 1874 of which 984 are males while 890 are females as per Population Census 2011.

In Ikolahi village, the population of children with age 0-6 is 205 which makes up 10.94% of total population of village. Average Sex Ratio of Ikolahi village is 904 which is higher than Punjab state average of 895. Child Sex Ratio for the Ikolahi as per census is 864, higher than Punjab average of 846.

Ikolahi village has higher literacy rate compared to Punjab. In 2011, literacy rate of Ikolahi village was 78.85% compared to 75.84% of Punjab. In Ikolahi, male literacy stands at 82.95% while female literacy rate was 74.34%.

== Panchyat ==
As per constitution of India and the Panchyati Raaj Act, Ikolahi village is administrated by Sarpanch (Head of Village) S. BIR SINGH.

== Education ==
Delhi Public School Khanna (DPS Khanna) is located in Ikolahi. It offers full 12th grade tuition for students.

Ikolahi has a government school up to 8th grade. This school has a playground. Additionally, within Ikolahi there is also Gurukul public school, for students up to 10th grade. There are many scientific amenities and cultural activities for students at Gurukul public school.
