= A S College =

College in Punjab, India

A S College, Khanna
- Established: 1946
- Accreditation: A S Mgt Society
- Academic affiliations: Punjab University, Chandigarh
- Location: Khanna - Samrala Road, Khanna, Punjab, India; 30.77197°N 76.19942°E
- Website: asckhn.com

Anglo Sanskrit College, Khanna is a post-secondary educational institution located on Khanna Samrala road near the village of Kalal Majra in Ludhiana district of the state of Punjab, India. It was rated highest A+ by National Assessment and Accreditation Council's. It was established as Anglo Sanskrit College in 1946 and now it is known simply as A S College. It is co-educational, affiliated to Punjab University, Chandigarh, and offers a variety of under graduate and post graduate courses in general streams of science and arts, with degree being awarded by Punjab University, Chandigarh. The college has been serving as a sought after place of higher learning for rural and urban students in the area with attracting students from as far away as Mandi Gobindgarh, Amloh, Samrala, Khamanon, and Machhiwara. It is particularly accessible to large rural population in surrounding areas with rural students making up a large number of its student population.

It is a University Grants Commission (UGC) recognised college. The Anglo Sanskrit High School Khanna Trust and Management Society, that is the governing body of this college, also runs other educational institutes in and around the city of Khanna namely A S College for Women, A S College of Education, A S Group of Institutions, A S Senior Secondary School, A S Modern Senior Secondary School, and M. G. C. A. S. Junior Model School.
