= Issru =

Isru
- Village
- Location within Punjab Location within India
- Coordinates: 30.6772334°N 76.1175272°E
- Country: India
- Region: Punjab
- District: Ludhiana
- Nearest city: Khanna

Isru is a village situated near Khanna, Ludhiana in Punjab, a state near the northern tip of India. It is a small municipality on Khanna Malerkotla Road, about 12 miles south from the town of Khanna.

== Population ==
According to the 2011 India Census, a total of 679 families reside in the Isru village. The Isru has population of 3462 people, of which 1837 are males, while 1625 are females.

In Isru, the village population of children with an age 0-6 is 343 which makes up 9.91% of the total population of the village. The average sex ratio of Isru village is 885 which is lower than Punjab's state average of 895. Child Sex Ratio for the Isru as per census is 649, lower than Punjab average of 846.
