= American School of Kuwait =

The American School of Kuwait

Location
- Kuwait
- 29.332047°N 48.034014°E

Information
- Type: Private
- Established: 1964; 62 years ago
- Principal: High School: John Rigney, Middle School: Les Moskaliuk, Elementary School: Rania Al Nakib
- Faculty: 182 full-time faculty 2018-2019 school year
- Grades: K-12
- Enrollment: 2,037
- Colors: Blue and gold
- Athletics conference: NESAC, KSAA, KSAC
- Mascot: Falcons
- Telephone: (+965) 2266-4341
- Website: http://www.ask.edu.kw

The American School of Kuwait (ASK) is a K-12 private school institution which also includes a pre-school (referred to as the Child Development Center). It is located in Hawalli, Kuwait.

== History ==
In 1963, a group of American parents began the process of forming a new international school in Kuwait. This new school's first term began in September, 1964, in the Dasman Area of Sharq, Kuwait, and was known as the International School of Kuwait. In 1969, the ASK Campus separated into two campuses, with one in Salwa and one in Surra. The Salwa campus contained the Elementary school, while the Surra campus contained both the Middle and High Schools. The school received its initial US accreditation from the Middle States Association in 1971, and has been receiving it continuously since then.

The school was closed for the 1990 to 1991 school term, due to the events of the invasion of Kuwait. The school reopened in the fall of 1991.

Over the summer of 1994, both ASK campuses, the Surra and Salwa campuses, moved to a new campus located in the Hawalli area. This reunited the elementary, middle, and high school students in one campus for the start of the 1994 to 1995 school term. The school has been at this location ever since.

== Present day ==
=== Administration ===
Mrs. Monique Livsey is the current superintendent of the school. The principals of each of the schools are Mr. John Rigney (High School), Mr. Les Moskaliuk (Middle School), and Dr. Rania AlNakib (Elementary School).

=== Faculty ===
The school currently has 183 full-time faculty members, including 88 American nationals, 35 Canadian citizens, and 60 teachers representing 14 other nationalities.

=== Student body ===
The School (as of September, 2018) had approximately 2,101 students total. Approximately 20% of the students are US citizens, 54% are locals, and the remaining 26% represent 65 other nationalities. Pre-K and elementary have 1012 students, the middle school has 471 students, and the high school has 618 students; there are 144 seniors, 151 juniors, 160 sophomores, and 163 freshmen.

=== Campus and facilities ===
The school possesses one of the largest campuses in Kuwait. The campus now houses 145 classrooms, which include eight computer labs, four music rooms, four art rooms, ten science labs, two large library/media centers, two gymnasiums, a fitness center and weight room, an indoor 25-meter pool, a large multi-purpose auditorium, and three large outdoor play areas/fields.

== Curriculum ==
The curriculum is similar to that of US general academic and college preparatory schools. The school's testing programs include the SAT, PSAT, Plan, Explore, ACT and the MAPS. The language of instruction is English. French and Spanish are taught as foreign languages. Religious instruction is required for Muslims, as is Arabic for all students (students who hold passports from Arab countries take Arabic language courses through graduation, while holders of passports from non-Arab countries take Arabic-As-a-Second-Language courses until grade 11).

The elementary program, in which teachers are organized into grade-level teams, features specialists in science, art, computer studies, music, drama, physical education, Arabic, and Islamic Studies. The middle school, which includes sixth through eighth grades, utilizes interdisciplinary teams and a curriculum based on a block schedule.

The American School of Kuwait is one of schools to offer the AP Capstone Diploma program.

== See also ==
- List of schools in Kuwait
- List of international schools
