= Sulikunte =

Village in Karnataka, India

- Village
- Location within Karnataka Location within India
- Coordinates: 12°53′18″N 77°43′45″E
- Country: India
- State: Karnataka
- District: Bangalore
- Taluk: Bangalore East

Area
  - Total: 4.197 km^{2} (1.620 sq mi)
- Elevation: 861 m (2,825 ft)

Population (2011)
  - Total: 2,295
  - Density: 546.8/km^{2} (1,416/sq mi)

Languages
  - Official: Kannada
- Time zone: UTC+5:30 (IST)
- PIN: 562125
- STD code: 080

Sulikunte is a village in Bangalore district, Karnataka, India. It is located to the southeast of Bengaluru. As of the year 2011, it had a total population of 2,295.

== Geography ==
Sulikunte is situated within Bangalore East taluk, covering an area of 419.7 hectares. It has an average elevation of 861 meters above the sea level.

== Demographics ==
As per the 2011 census of India, there were 2,295 people residing in Sulikunte. The average literacy rate was 70.07%, with 880 of the male residents and 728 of the female residents being literate.
