= Ali Saad =

Ali Saad may refer to:

- Ali Saad (actor), Lebanese actor
- Ali Saad (Canadian football) (born 2002), defensive lineman
- Ali Saad (minister) (born 1953), Syrian minister
