= Bhankrota =

Bhankrota Bhakrot, Baklota, Bangrota
- Urban
- Location in Jaipur, Rajasthan, India Bhankrota (Rajasthan) Bhankrota (India)
- Coordinates: 26°52′9″N 75°41′26″E
- Country: India
- State: Rajasthan
- District: Jaipur

Languages
  - Official: Hindi
- Time zone: UTC+5:30 (IST)
- Postal code: 302026
- Telephone code: 0141
- Vehicle registration: RJ 14
- Nearest city: Jaipur

Bhankrota or Bang Rota is a residential locality within Jaipur, India. Started in the 1980s, it boomed in population in the late 1990s.

== Description and history ==
Bhankrota is known for its residential and student living center. It has many restaurants, and a small market connected to each block of the larger town. Bhankrota is approximately 15 km from the Jaipur Junction railway station. The national highway connects it to major cities of India such as Delhi, Jaipur, Ahmedabad, and Mumbai.

At Bhankrota bus stand, for supplying drinking water to the locality, an old water tank was inaugurated by the Queen of Britain, Elizabeth II on 22 January 1961, the exact day when Bhankrota was electrified.

The rapid urbanization of Jaipur has led to mushrooming of residential societies all over the city, noted societies are now coming out of Jaisinghpura, 3 km away from Bhankrota which is also resident to many Nepalese and NRIs. There are several migrants from Madhya Pradesh, Uttar Pradesh and Kerala near the Keshopura locality.

== Getting there ==
=== Train ===
The nearest Metro stations are Mansarover (5 km) and Sodala (7 km). The Blue Line of the Metro, which starts from Chandpole, connects Bhankrota to Civil Line and Jhotwara.

=== Bus routes ===
1. Bagru–Naila–Bagru
2. Bhamboria–Bobas
3. Chandpole–Bhankrota (Low Floor Bus)
4. Bhankrota–Kukas–Amer
5. Bagru–Jaipur Link

== Education ==
Bhankrota is known for its educational campuses. The Rajasthan Engineering College or Rajasthan Institute of Engineering and Technology (RIET), Rajasthan Engineering College for Women (RCEW), Kandoi Paramedical Institute (KPI) and Kandoi Hospital, Swabhimaan ITI College, Jaisinghpura, Polytechnic College, Rajasthan Dental College and Hospital (RDCH, Jaipur) are among the primary educational Institutes in the locality. The Rajasthan Dental College and Hospital is located just 10 km from Bhankrota on Ajmer Road, Bagru.

== FM radio ==
- Radio 7 - 90.7 FM
- Radio City - 91.1 FM
- Big 92.7 Fm - 92.7 FM (via. Ajmer)
- Red FM - 93.5 FM
- My Fm - 94.3 FM
- Fm Tadka - 95.0 FM
- Radio Mirchi - 98.3 FM
- Vividh Bharti/Pink City FM - 101.2 FM
- Gyan Vani - 106.1 FM
- Love Mirchi - 104 FM
