= Kuwait English School =

- Salwa Block 11; Kuwait

Information
- Type: Independent
- Motto: "The Aim Makes Great the Life"
- Established: 1978
- Head of school: Nicholas Gunn
- Faculty: approx. 100-450
- Enrollment: approx. 2400-2500
- Website: www.kes.edu.kw

Kuwait English School (abbreviation: KES) is an independent and private international school in Kuwait. The main campus of the school is located in Salwa. It provides a British curriculum education from kindergarten to A-Level. It is estimated that the school employs between 100 and 400 faculty.

== History ==
The Kuwait English School was established in 1978 by Jassim Al Saddah, who acted as the chairman of the school, alongside Rhoda Elizabeth Muhmood, as the school's director until 2022. The school was originally established as a villa until 1984 where they established a "proper" school facility.

In 1991, the school opened and established the Green Unit Department, a program department catering toward students with learning disabilities and special needs. Shortly after the liberation of Kuwait, the school was visited by Anne, Princess Royal. Shortly after, in 1997, the school opened a specialised learning centre known as the "Millennium Centre". This centre was opened by then-Under-Secretary of State for the Ministry of Higher Education Rasha Al Sabah.

== Sports ==
The Kuwait English School has an after-school sports program under the BSME Games conference. Students may join teams divided by the junior and senior programs, including football, basketball, volleyball, unihoc, netball, benchball, cricket, and swimming.
