= Rauni, Ludhiana =

Rauni
- village
- Location in Punjab, India Rauni (India)
- Coordinates: 30.5786900°N 76.105630°E
- Country: India
- State: Punjab
- District: ludhiana

Languages
  - Official: Punjabi
- Time zone: UTC+5:30 (IST)
- Nearest city: Khanna
- Lok Sabha constituency: Fatehgarh Sahib
- Vidhan Sabha constituency: Payal

Rauni is a village in the Ludhiana District of Punjab, India. A library named Baba Sajjan Sidh Rural Library-cum-Computer Centre, was set up in the village in March 2009. It has a population of 4230 people as per 2011 census.
