= Fahaheel Al-Watanieh Indian Private School =

- Al-Ahmadi; Al Ahmadi Governorate; Kuwait

Information
- Type: Private international school
- Motto: Service Before Self
- Established: 11 September 1995
- School board: CBSE
- Staff: 600+
- Grades: K-12 based
- Enrollment: 7000+
- Language: English, Hindi, French, Arabic
- Website: https://www.faipskuwait.com

Al-Fahaheel Indian Private School is an international private school located in Al-Ahamdi, Kuwait. The school was founded on September 11, 1995. It teaches all age groups from primary to secondary education. The school is recognized by the Ministry of Education in Kuwait and is a member of the Central Board of Secondary Education of the Indian Federation (CBSE).

== History ==
FAIPS was established on 11 September 1995. The school has expanded over the years and now occupies a large campus with play areas, auditorium, and laboratories.

== Curriculum ==
The school follows the CBSE curriculum for all grades. Instruction is primarily in English. Hindi and French are offered as second languages, and Arabic is taught in accordance with Ministry of Education requirements. Students are prepared for the All India Secondary School Examination (AISSE) and the All India Senior School Certificate Examination (AISSCE).

== Facilities ==
FAIPS has multiple academic facilities:

=== Classrooms and laboratories ===
- 111 classrooms
- Science labs: Physics (1), Chemistry (1), Biology (1), Composite Science (1)
- 3 Computer Labs
- Home Science Lab, Mathematics Lab, Demonstration Lab, Language Lab
- Two libraries: Junior and Senior sections

=== Libraries ===
The libraries contain books, periodicals, reference materials, and magazines to support academic and extracurricular activities.

== Certificates ==
The school is recognized by the Ministry of Education, Kuwait and affiliated to the Central Board of Secondary Education, New Delhi.

== Languages ==
Teaching is conducted in English as a compulsory language; Hindi and French is taught as a second language until age 13, after which French and Hindi are optional. Arabic is taught as a third language from grades 1 to 9. curriculum, faipskuwait
