= Delhi Public School Society =

Indian private school society

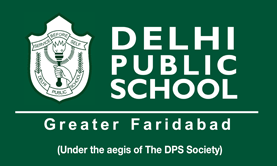
- Logo of DPS Greater Faridabad (a part of Delhi Public School Society)
- All over India

Information
- School type: Private
- Motto: Service before self
- Established: 1949; 77 years ago
- Mascot: Torch
- Affiliations: CBSE; CISCE
- Website: dpsfamily.org

Delhi Public School Society (DPSS) or DPS Society, is a chain of schools. The descriptor "Public School" references the model of the long-established public schools in the United Kingdom. It operates as a non-profit and private organization. The Delhi Public School Society is the administrative authority for all its institutions in India and abroad. The DPSS Global Network comprises approximately 222 English medium, co-educational, secular schools, catering to students from PG (Play Group) to Class XII.

== History ==
The first school associated with the Delhi Public School Society was Delhi Public School, Mathura Road established in 1949. The foundation stone of the school building was laid in 1956 by Vice President S. Radhakrishnan.

== Accreditation ==
The Central Board of Secondary Education (CBSE) provides accreditation for all schools in the society except for four; DPS New Town, Kolkata; DPS Mega City, Kolkata; and DPS International, Singapore, are affiliated with the Indian Certificate of Secondary Education (ICSE), whilst DPS International, Saket, New Delhi, is affiliated with the International General Certificate of Secondary Education (IGCSE).

== List of schools ==
=== Core schools ===
As of October 2025, there are 13 core branches of the Delhi Public School. The list of core schools is as follows:

1. Delhi Public School, Mathura Road, New Delhi
2. Delhi Public School, R. K. Puram, New Delhi
3. Delhi Public School, Noida, Uttar Pradesh
4. Delhi Public School, Vasant Kunj, New Delhi
5. Delhi Public School, Faridabad, Haryana
6. Delhi Public School, Rohini, Delhi
7. Delhi Public School, Dwarka, Delhi
8. Delhi Public School, Greater Noida, Uttar Pradesh
9. Delhi Public School, Bulandshahr, Uttar Pradesh
10. Delhi Public School, Nerul, Navi Mumbai
11. Delhi Public School International, Saket, New Delhi
12. Delhi Public School, Knowledge Park-5, Greater Noida, Uttar Pradesh
13. Delhi Public School, Sector-122, Noida

=== Franchise school ===
As of July 2025, there are 204 schools running under the DPS Society as franchises in India, and 5 more abroad. These are not core schools and are not managed directly by the DPS Society.

== Controversy ==
Due to its legacy, good academic and extra curricular performance, and alumni network, schools affiliated with the Delhi Public School Society are considered reputable in India. This has given rise to other schools not affiliated with the "Delhi Public School Society" naming and branding themselves as DPS schools.

The first such case was that of the "Delhi Public School Ghaziabad Society" which was started in collaboration with the Delhi Public School Society but later became a separate organization, and currently runs a chain of eight schools. A court case was filed in 2002 in the Delhi High Court by the Delhi Public School Society against the Delhi Public School Ghaziabad Society was dismissed for lack of jurisdiction.

A second case, involved DPS alumni and society president Salman Khurshid, starting a parallel organization DPS World Foundation to run schools under the name of DPS World Schools. Khurshid was thrown out of the DPS society and a case was filed against his foundation. The Supreme Court of India decided in favor of DPS society and DPS World Foundation changed its name to Delhi World Foundation and currently runs a chain of 60 schools named Delhi World Public Schools.

The third such case was of the DPS Trust. The organization based in Rohini, New Delhi offered franchises to open schools under the brand name of DPS in smaller cities. The Delhi High Court, on 16 December 2012, barred the 'DPS Trust' from using the name 'DPS' or its registered logo as well as the name Delhi Public School for running a school or education-related services. The trust was ordered to pay Rs 10 lakh as damages.

== Arvey Malhotra suicide case ==
Arvey Malhotra, a 10th-grade student at DPS school at Greater Faridabad allegedly committed suicide at his residence blaming the school for inaction on his complaints about bullying. In his suicide note, he alleged that the school administration and other students bullied him over his sexuality and the school's headmistress was held on the charges of abetment to suicide. Arvey's mother alleged the homophobic nature of bullying and history of sexual assault in the DPS school.
