= Khanna, Ludhiana =

Khanna
- City
- Location in Punjab, India Khanna (India)
- Coordinates: 30.70°N 76.22°E
- Country: India
- State: Punjab
- District: Ludhiana

Area
  - Total: 32 km^{2} (12 sq mi)
- Elevation: 254 m (833 ft)

Population (2011)
  - Total: 128,137
  - Density: 4,000/km^{2} (10,000/sq mi)

Languages
  - Official: Punjabi
  - Native: Puadhi
- Time zone: UTC+5:30 (IST)
- PIN: 141401
- Telephone code: 01628
- Vehicle registration: PB-26

Khanna is a city and a municipal council in the Ludhiana district of the Indian state of Punjab. It is known for having Asia's largest grain market.

The city is 40 km from the city of Ludhiana on the Grand Trunk Road (National Highway 1). Its area is about 70 km^{2}. Villages nearby include Baghaur (Aujla), Kauri, Payal, Ikolahi, Rahoun, Issru, Harion Kalan, Aloona Miana, Bulepur, Bhamaddi, Rasulra, Ghutind, Bhattian, Libra, Ratan Heri, Bahumajra, Salana, Ramgarh, Salaudi Singha and Mohanpur.

== Toponymy ==
Khanna is a Punjabi word, which means one quarter (1/4 or 0.25).

== History ==
History reveals that Sher Shah Suri built a number of sarais (inns) at every 12 to 15 miles along the Delhi-Lahore road. One of the sarais was built in this area which is still known as the Purani Sarai (or old inn). After the decline of Mughal rule in the Punjab, Banda Bahadur captured the area from Sirhind to Hoshiarpur. After that a Jathedar of Dahedu controlled and occupied the whole of the area from Dahedu to Nabha. He married his daughter, Daya Kaur, to the King of Nabha. When a family dispute arose between the King and his new wife, she left Nabha for good and went back to live with her parents in Dahedu. According to Indian conventions she could not remain there forever. Therefore, her father gave her a "kann", or a "small portion", of the territory between Dahedu and Nabha that was well known for its agriculture. Over time, the pronunciation of the name changed from "Kann" to "Khanna".

== Climate ==
The city has a humid subtropical climate (Koppen: Cwa), with wet and warm summers and dry and cool winters.

Khanna has been ranked 34th best “National Clean Air City” under (Category 3 population under 3 lakhs cities) in India.

== Demographics ==
As per provisional data of the 2011 census, Khanna had a population of 128,130, out of which 67,811 were male and 60,319 were female. The literacy rate was 84.43 per cent.

The table below shows the population of different religious groups in Khanna city, as of the 2011 census.

Population by religious groups in Khanna city, 2011 census
Religion	Total	Female	Male
Hindu	72,281	33,765	38,516
Sikh	52,240	24,944	27,296
Muslim	2,513	1,110	1,403
Christian	661	313	348
Jain	87	41	46
Buddhist	11	2	9
Other religions	68	31	37
Not stated	276	130	146
Total	128,137	60,336	67,801

== Education ==
Khanna has the following institutions for education:

1. A S College Khanna
2. IGNOU Regional Centre, Khanna
3. Planet E School (PES), Khanna
4. Delhi Public School Khanna

== Transport ==
Khanna railway station is situated on the Ambala–Attari line under Ambala railway division of Northern Railway zone.

== Notable people ==
- Bhagat Puran Singh, social worker
- Dharmendra, Veteran actor
- Karan Aujla, singer, lyricist
- Jassi Gill, singer
- Labh Janjua, singer
- Sardool Sikander, singer
- Dilpreet Dhillon, singer
- G Deep, singer
- Desi Crew, music director
- Davinder Khannewala, lyricist
- Bittu khannewala, singer

== See also ==
- Rauni
