= Michael Young =

Michael Young may refer to:

== Academics ==
- Michael Young, Baron Young of Dartington (1915–2002), British life peer, sociologist and social activist
- Michael Young (educationalist), British educational theorist and sociologist
- Michael K. Young (born 1949), former president of Texas A&M University
- Michael W. Young (born 1949), American geneticist and chrono biologist (Nobel Prize laureate in Physiology or Medicine)
- Michael W. Young (anthropologist) (born 1937), British anthropologist
- Mike Young (economist), Australian economist
- Mike Young (Royal Navy officer) (born 1967), British consultant and academic

== Arts and entertainment ==
- Michael Young (actor) (born 1952), host of Diaries of a Xenophobe and How to Make Love to an Immigrant
- Michael Young (industrial designer) (born 1966), British product and furniture designer
- Mike Young (producer) (born 1945), Welsh television producer and founder of Mike Young Productions
- Mike Young (game designer), American game designer, author, and entrepreneur
- Mike Young (Misfits), fictional character on British TV programme
- Mike Young (Neighbours), Australian soap opera character

== Politics ==
- Michael Young, Baron Young of Dartington (1915–2002), British life peer, sociologist and social activist
- Michael Young (businessman) (1945–2023), British executive who facilitated the political process which led to the end of apartheid in South Africa
- Michael Young (Canadian politician) (1934–2010), Canadian mayor of Victoria, British Columbia
- R. Michael Young (born 1951), member of the Indiana Senate
- Michael Hughes-Young, 1st Baron St Helens (1912–1980), British army officer and politician
- Mike Young (agriculture official), American government official
- Mick Young (1936–1996), Australian House of Representatives

== Sports ==
=== American football ===
- Mike Young (American football) (born 1962), American football wide receiver
- Michael Young (linebacker) (born 1978), American football linebacker and scout
- Michael Young Jr. (born 1999), American football wide receiver

=== Baseball ===
- Michael Young (baseball) (born 1976), American baseball player
- Mike Young (baseball) (1960–2023), American baseball player
- Mike Young (cricket) (born 1955), Australian cricket coach and baseball manager

=== Basketball ===
- Michael Young (basketball, born 1961), American basketball player
- Michael Young (basketball, born 1994), American basketball player
- Mike Young (basketball) (born 1963), American basketball coach

=== Rugby ===
- Michael Young (rugby league) (born 1984), Australian rugby league player
- Micky Young (born 1988), English rugby union player

=== Other sports ===
- Michael Young (bobsleigh) (born 1944), Canadian bobsledder
- Michael Young (Australian rules footballer) (1958–2018), Australian rules footballer
- Mike Young (racing driver), American stock car racing driver

== Other ==
- Michael Young-Suk Oh (born 1971), Korean American evangelical
- Mike Young (cave diver), American cave explorer and rebreather designer
