= Dawrat =

Kuwaiti educational platform

- Website type: Online education
- Available in: Arabic
- Founded: 2011
- Website: dawrat.com
- Registration: Required
- Current status: Active

Dawrat (Arabic: دورات, meaning Courses in English) is an educational platform for Massive Open Online Courses (MOOC) founded in 2011 and headquartered in Kuwait, it is aimed at students in the Middle East and North Africa.

== History ==
Dawrat was founded in 2011 by Mohammad Al Suraye and Youssef Bonachi as a site where course organizers, instructors, colleges and educational institutes can create their own accounts, provide training courses and communicate with students. As of 2022, the platform has more than 100,000 students and instructors, and more than 10,000 courses in Arabic language.

In 2014, Dawrat has offered 16.67% of its stake to those wishing to participate in the company’s crowdfunding process, after the number of visitors reached more than 1,000 visitors per day.

In May 2015, Dawrat launched the Learn anytime anywhere initiative under the auspices of the Kuwaiti Ministry of State for Youth Affairs to provide online learning and training courses for graduate students.

In December 2020, Dawrat entered into an agreement with the Kuwait College of Science and Technology to provide scientific content and technology-related training courses prepared by professors and assistant professors at the college. In the same year, Dawrat cooperated with the Public Authority for Youth in Kuwait to provide 750 free courses for young trainees.

In March 2021, Capital SBX and investor Farah Al Humaidhi funded Dawrat with an undisclosed amount and acquired 40% of the platform's shares.

== Recognitions ==
In May 2015, the platform won the Kuwait eContent Award presented by the Kuwait Foundation for the Advancement of Sciences.

In January 2017, the founder of the platform, Mohammad Al Suraye, won the Kuwait Youth Excellence and Creativity Award in its first season for creating Dawrat and was honored by the former Emir of Kuwait, Sabah Al-Ahmad Al-Jaber Al-Sabah.
