= List of universities in Kuwait =

This is a list of universities and colleges in Kuwait:

Government Universities:

- Kuwait University (KU)
- Abdullah Al Salem University (AASU)

Private Universities:

- Gulf University for Science and Technology (GUST)
- American University of Kuwait (AUK)
- Australian College of Kuwait (ACK)
- American University of the Middle East (AUM)
- American International University - Kuwait (AIU)
- Arab Open University (AOU)
- Kuwait Maastricht Business School
- Kuwait College of Science and Technology (KCST)
- International University of Kuwait (IUK)
