= Mubarak Ali Al Sabah =

Kuwaiti coast guard commander

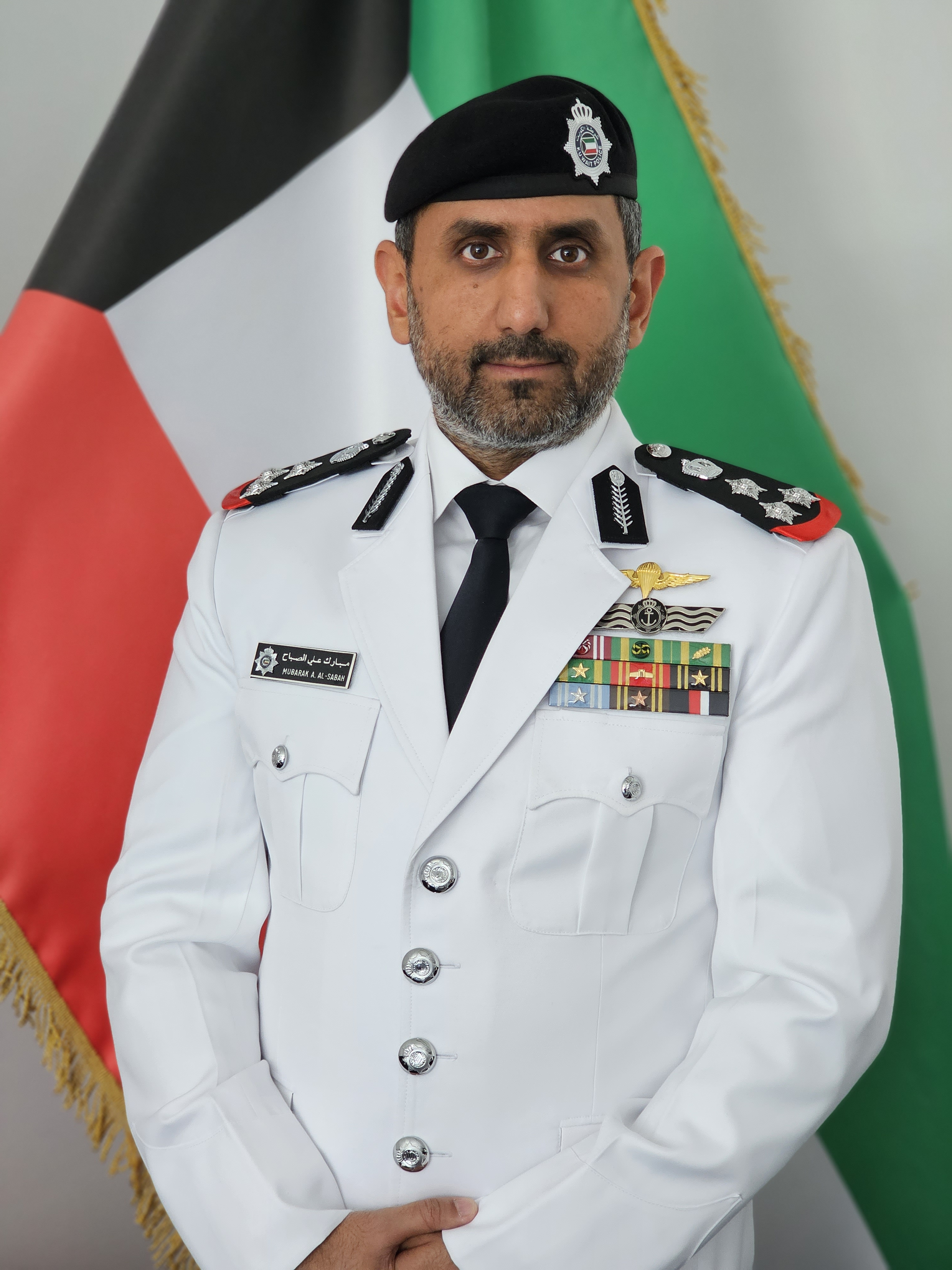
- Born: August 12, 1979 (age 47); Kuwait
- Military career
- Allegiance: Kuwait
- Branch: Naval component of the Kuwaiti Ministry of Interior
- Service years: 2000–current
- Rank: Commodore
- Commands: Kuwait naval ship Maskan P3717; Kuwait coast guard ship Mash'hoor P315
- Conflicts: Operation Iraqi Freedom
- Awards: Al-Soor Medal; Silver Service Medal; Bronze Service Medal

Commodore Sheikh Mubarak Ali Yousuf Al Sabah (12 Aug 1979) the eldest son of Sheikh Ali Yousuf Al Sabah and Sheikha Awrad Jaber Al Sabah, the daughter of the former Emir of Kuwait, His Highness Jaber Al-Ahmad Al-Jaber Al-Sabah.

== Military career ==
Joined the Kuwait Navy as an officer cadet in 2000, and was commissioned as a Sub Lieutenant in 2002. The same year he attended the British Royal Navy's young officer course at Britannia Royal Naval College, and also attended the Ali Al-Sabah military college in Kuwait, where he graduated with a diploma in military science.

He served on board Kuwait naval ship (Maskan P3717) as Navigation and Communications officer, completed several courses, including Surface warfare officer course in Coronado, United States of America and bridge watch keeping course in the Kingdom of Bahrain, also participated in Operation Iraqi Freedom and received (Al-Soor) Medal, then transferred his services to the Kuwait Coast Guard which is part of the Ministry of Interior in September 2004 and served as a commanding officer of coast guard ship (Mash'hoor P315).

Sheikh Mubarak has consistently promoted the value of an educated and skilled workforce. Encouraging the development of professional and academic skills in maritime studies, engineering and leadership. He has gone to hold a number of appointments with the Kuwait coast guard and in November 2009 he was appointed as Chief of Maritime Operations in the Coast Guard. participated in several exercises during his service with (Kingdom of Saudi Arabia, the Republic of Iraq, the United States of America, United Kingdom, Australia, kingdom of Bahrain, United Arab Emirates and the Sultanate of Oman ), and also participated as keynote speaker and submitted study cases at 3rd International Symposium on Maritime Disaster Management in Saudi Arabia 2011, the Maritime Security & Surveillance conference in Abu Dhabi, UAE 2012 and the maritime infrastructure protection symposium in the Kingdom of Bahrain 2013.

Commodore Al Sabah is a combat-tested leader who has earned frontline experience through Operation Iraqi Freedom and numerous joint maritime exercises throughout the Middle East, United Kingdom and United States of America. His leadership during these exercises has earned him the trust and respect of naval and military leaders from across the international community. His command, staff appointments, education and experience have broadened his strategic perspective. His strategic perspective have led him to organizing international conferences, media events and high-level strategic engagements to enhance regional, national and international security. Most notable, is his keen ability to anticipate emerging opportunities, and security threats in the Middle East region at levels normally expected of diplomats, naval or military leaders senior to him in rank. In February 2019, Commodore Mubarak Ali Al Sabah assumed duties as Commander of Combined Task Force 152 responsible for coordinating and enhancing regional maritime security and cooperation in the Arabian Gulf. He led the largest sustained Joint Patrol in CTF 152 recent history with over 60 Naval and Coast Guard vessels from contributing nations of Combined Maritime Forces. In September 2019, Commodore Mubarak Ali Al Sabah assumed duties as Assistant to Commander CMF for Regional Integrations. He currently is a senior official of Kuwait's Ministry of Interior promoting Public Diplomacy, Foreign Policy and International Relations.

== Qualifications ==
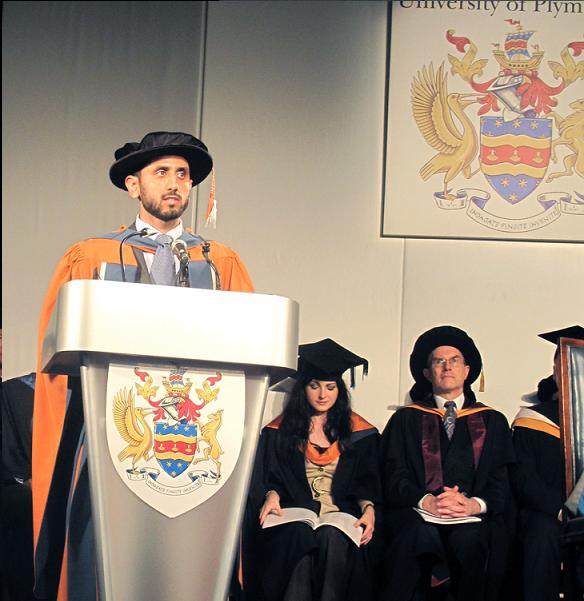
Mubarak Ali Al Receiving his Honorary PhD from University of Plymouth

- Master of Arts (MA), International Security & Strategy - King's College London (2015)
- Bachelor of Engineering Technology, Electronics & Control - Australian College of Kuwait (2014)
- Master in Military Sciences - Mubarak Al Abdullah Joint Command and Staff College (2011).
- Honorary Doctorate in Maritime Science from the Plymouth University (UK) 2010.
- Diploma in Electronic Engineering from the Australian College of Kuwait (Kuwait) 2009.
- Diploma in Military Science from Ali Al-Sabah Military College (Kuwait) 2002.
- Royal Navy Young Officer Course from Britannia Royal Naval College (UK) 2002.

== Courses ==
- Basic Firefighting & Damage Control Course from Phoenix NBCD School, HMS Excellent (UK) July 2001.
- Naval General Training Course in Leadership, Navigation, Seamanship from Britannia Royal Naval College (UK) April 2002.
- Naval Studies Course in Computing, Marine Environment, Radar & Telecommunications from Britannia Royal Naval College (UK) April 2002.
- Advanced Shipboard Damage Control Training Course at Fleet Training Center San Diego, California (USA)September 2002.
- Advanced Shipboard Fire Fighting Course at Fleet Training Center San Diego, California (USA) October 2002.
- USPA (United States Parachute Association) License No. A-42025 on Free Fall Jumps from 13,000 ft or above November 2002.
- Surface Warfare Officer Course (K-2G-0036) from Expeditionary Warfare Training Group, Pacific (USA) December 2002.
- Bridge Watchkeeping Certificate from Bahrain Royal Naval Force (Bahrain) March 2004.
- Training Course in Control & Inspection Rules & Procedure from Kuwait Institute for Judicial and Legal Studies November 2006.
- Ways of dealing with diplomatic persons course – University of Kuwait November 2008.
- International and Territorial waters law order course from the Arab regional center for environmental law December 2008
- Joint Command and Staff course 15 - Mubarak Al-Abdullah Joint Command and Staff college (Kuwait) June 2011.
- Royal College of Defence Studies course 15 - (UK) 2015.
