= KMBS =

KMBS may refer to:

- KMBS (AM), a radio station (1310 AM) licensed to West Monroe, Louisiana, United States
- Kanpur Metropolitan Bus Service
- Kuwait Maastricht Business School
- MBS International Airport (ICAO:KMBS), in Freeland, Michigan, United States
