= Britannia Royal Naval College =

Initial officer training establishment of the British Royal Navy

Coordinates: 50°21′26″N 03°34′58″W

Britannia Royal Naval College Dartmouth
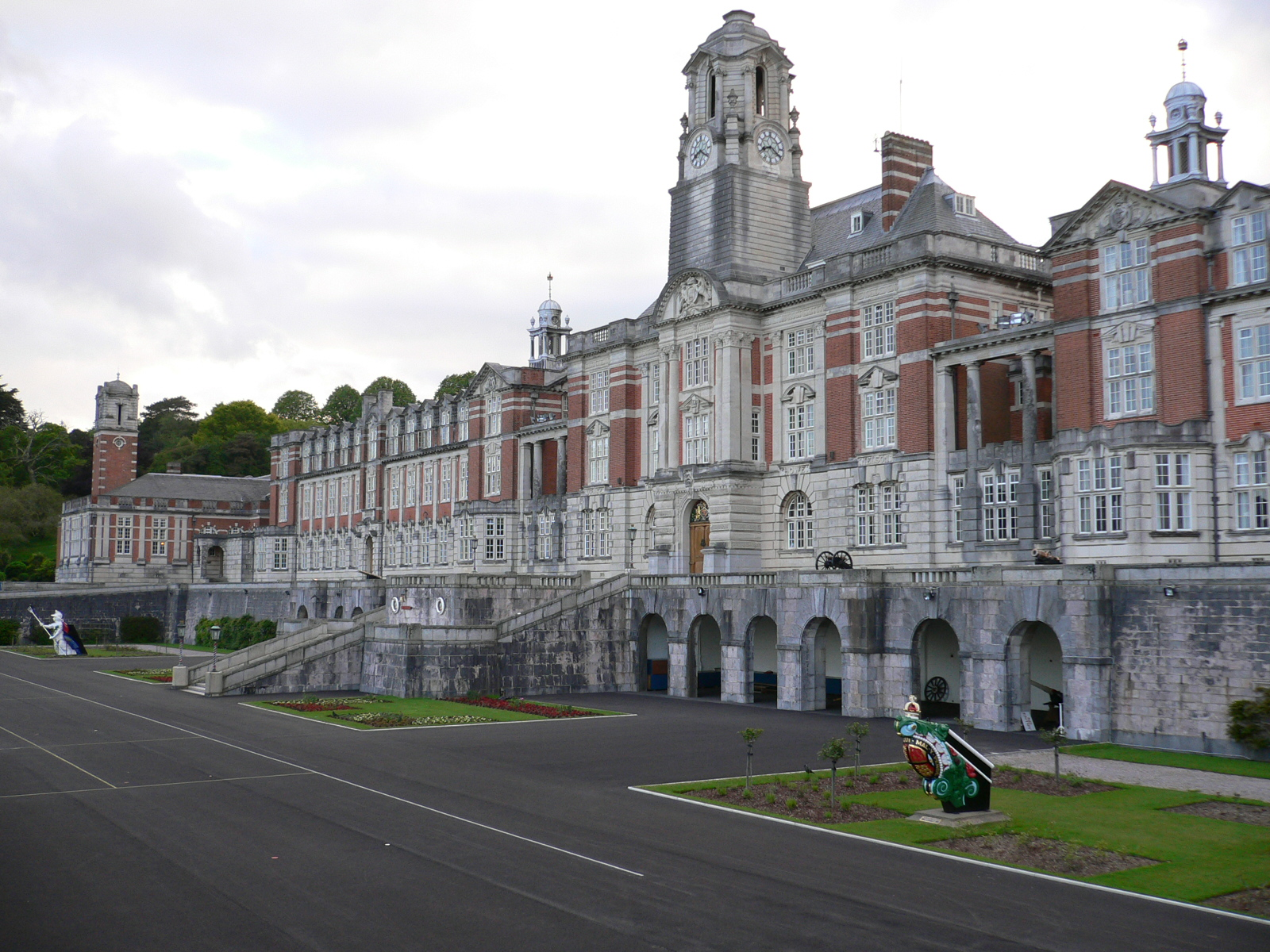
- Motto: Lead with Courage
- Type: Naval academy
- Established: 1863 (HMS Britannia)
- Parent institution: Director People and Training
- Affiliations: Royal Navy
- Commanding officer: Captain Simon Cox OBE
- Location: Dartmouth, Devon, United Kingdom
- Website: royalnavy.mod.uk/brnc-dartmouth

Britannia Royal Naval College Dartmouth, also known as Dartmouth, is the naval academy of the United Kingdom and the initial officer training academy of the Royal Navy. It is located on a hill overlooking the port of Dartmouth, Devon, England. Royal Naval officer training has taken place in Dartmouth since 1863. The buildings of the current campus were completed in 1905. Earlier students lived in two wooden hulks moored in the River Dart. Since 1998, BRNC has been the sole centre for Royal Naval officer training.

== History ==
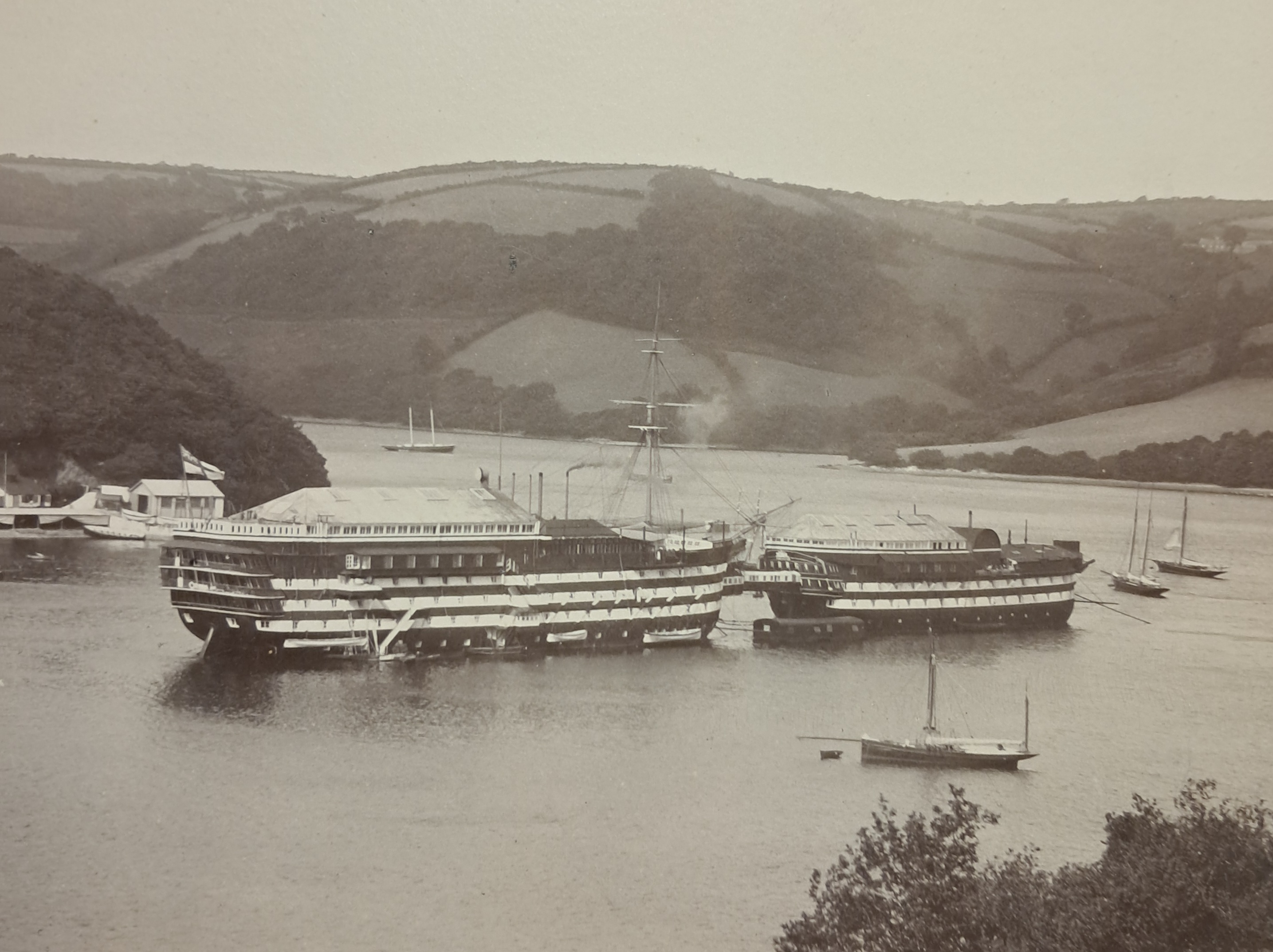
Wooden hulks Britannia and Hindostan at Dartmouth in 1893.

The training of naval officers at Dartmouth dates from 1863, when the wooden hulk HMS Britannia was moved from Portland and moored in the River Dart to serve as a base. In 1864, after an influx of new recruits, Britannia was supplemented by HMS Hindostan. Prior to this, a Royal Naval Academy (later Royal Naval College) had operated for more than a century from 1733 to 1837 at Portsmouth, a major naval installation. The original Britannia was replaced by the Prince of Wales in 1869, which was renamed Britannia.

The foundation stone for a new building at the college was laid by King Edward VII in March 1902. Sir Aston Webb designed the shore-based college at Dartmouth, which was built by Higgs and Hill and practically completed in 1905.

From September 1903, officer cadets first entered the Royal Naval College, Osborne, then after two years transferred to Dartmouth, and the first such intake was in September 1905.

The Britannia training establishment was closed at the same time. The cadets under instruction were embarked on two cruisers to complete their programme under the old system. The headquarters of the cruisers was established at Bermuda, where suitable arrangements had been made to house the cadets. The cadets entered in September under the old system, and those entered in January 1906 (the last to be so entered), were received at the Royal Naval College, Dartmouth, where they were instructed, as far as possible, side by side with the cadets transferred from Osborne.

— Lord Tweedmouth, First Lord of the Admiralty, 26 February 1906

The college was originally known as the Royal Naval College, Dartmouth (RNC). As a Royal Naval shore establishment, it was later known also by the ship name HMS Britannia (a battleship called Britannia operated from 1904 to 1918). The college was renamed HMS Dartmouth in 1953, when the name Britannia was given to the newly launched royal yacht HMY Britannia. The training ship moored in the River Dart at Sandquay, a Sandown class minehunter formerly known as HMS Cromer, continues to bear the name Hindostan. As of 2025, eight 15-metre Sea-class workboats (Cormorant, Guillemot, Razorbill, Kittiwake, Fulmar, Skua, Gannet and Tern) are assigned to the College for the purpose of training officer cadets.

Cadets originally joined the Royal Naval College, Osborne, at Osborne House, at the age of 13 for two years' study and work before joining Dartmouth. The Royal Naval College, Osborne closed in 1921.

During the Second World War, after six Focke-Wulf aircraft bombed the College in September 1942, students and staff moved activities to Eaton Hall in Cheshire until the autumn of 1946. Two bombs had penetrated the College's main block, causing damage to the quarterdeck and surrounding rooms.

Britannia Royal Naval College became the sole naval college in the United Kingdom following the closures of the Royal Naval Engineering College, Manadon, in 1994 and of the Royal Naval College, Greenwich, in 1998.

In 2020, a group of Junior Rates were trained at BRNC to help alleviate added pressure on HMS Raleigh, after a surge in recruitment. On 13 August 2020, a troop of 34 Ratings and 130 officers passed out simultaneously for the first time in the history of the Royal Navy. They were followed by a second class of Junior Rates who passed out on 17 December 2020.

== Entry ==
Prospective cadets entrants must meet a minimum academic requirement. They then proceed to the Admiralty Interview Board, where they are tested mentally and physically. Several mental aptitude tests are administered, along with a basic physical fitness test and a medical examination. Officer cadets, as they are known until passing out from the college, can join between the ages of 18 and 39. While most cadets join BRNC after finishing university, some join directly from secondary school. The commissioning course is 29 weeks, with Warfare Officers and Aircrew spending a further 19 weeks studying academics at the college. A large contingent of international and Commonwealth students are part of the student body. The Royal Fleet Auxiliary sends its officer cadets to BRNC for a 3-week initial officer training course, before they start at a maritime college.

== Ofsted criticism ==
An Ofsted report on BRNC in 2023 described the college as being filled with "rot and mould". Inspectors also cited unsafe structures, ill-fitting equipment, staff shortages and medical inspection delays. Inspectors noted how windows in some dormitories were boarded over due to rot while "mould is growing on window frames and ceilings".

Dartmouth was rated by Ofsted as inadequate. Amanda Spielman, Ofsted's Chief Inspector, said Dartmouth received the rating due to the poor state of the college's infrastructure which was due to "a lack of investment over many decades".

== Royal cadets ==
King George V and King George VI were naval cadets at Dartmouth. The first "significant encounter" between Prince Philip of Greece and the then Princess Elizabeth took place at Dartmouth in July 1939, where Philip was a naval cadet. Charles III and Andrew Mountbatten-Windsor also attended Dartmouth. William, Prince of Wales spent a brief period at the College after leaving Sandhurst as part of his training with all three of Britain's Armed Forces.

Sheikh Mubarak Ali Yousuf Suoud Al-Sabah, a member of the Royal Family of Kuwait, attended the Royal Navy Young Officer Course at Britannia Royal Naval College in 2002. Sheikh Isa bin Salman bin Hamad Al Khalifa, the eldest son of the Crown Prince of Bahrain, also underwent training at BRNC (including time at sea in RN warships) from 2014 to 2015, prior to commencing active service in the Royal Bahrain Naval Force.

== Commanders of the college ==
List below based on listing compiled by historian Colin Mackie; additional references are given in the list.

- Captain William E. Goodenough: May 1905 – August 1907
- Captain Trevylyan D. W. Napier: August 1907 – July 1910
- Captain Hugh Evan-Thomas: July 1910 – July 1912
- Captain the Hon. Victor A. Stanley: July 1912 – ? 1914
- Rear-Admiral Trevylyan D. W. Napier: September–December 1914
- Captain Edmond Hyde Parker: ? 1914 – February 1915
- Captain Norman C. Palmer: February 1915 – May 1916
- Rear-Admiral William G. E. Ruck Keene: May 1916 – January 1919
- Captain Eustace la T. Leatham: February 1919 – February 1921
- Captain Francis A. Marten: February 1921 – January 1923
- Captain the Hon. Herbert Meade: January 1923 – February 1926
- Captain Martin E. Dunbar-Nasmith: February 1926 – February 1929
- Captain Sidney J. Meyrick: February 1929 – December 1931
- Captain Norman A. Wodehouse: December 1931 – December 1934
- Captain Reginald V. Holt: December 1934 – December 1936
- Captain Frederick H. G. Dalrymple-Hamilton: December 1936 – November 1939
- Captain Robert L. B. Cunliffe: December 1939 – April 1942
- Captain Edward A. Aylmer: April 1942 – December 1943
- Captain Gerald H. Warner: December 1943–?
- Captain Peveril B. R. W. William-Powlett: January 1946 – February 1948
- Captain Hugh W. Faulkner: February 1948 – August 1949
- Captain Norman V. Dickinson: August 1949 – April 1951
- Captain Richard T. White: April 1951 – August 1953
- Captain William G. Crawford: August 1953 – April 1956
- Captain William J. Munn: April 1956 – August 1958
- Captain Frank H. E. Hopkins: August 1958 – August 1960
- Captain Horace R. Law: August 1960 – December 1961
- Captain W. John Parker: December 1961 – September 1963
- Captain John E. L. Martin: September 1963 – August 1966
- Captain Ian W. Jamieson: August 1966 – April 1968
- Captain David Williams: April 1968 – September 1970
- Captain A. Gordon Tait: September 1970 – August 1972
- Captain John M. Forbes: August 1972 – September 1974
- Captain Michael A. Higgs: September 1974 – September 1976
- Captain Paul W. Greening: September 1976 – October 1978
- Captain Nicholas J. S. Hunt: October 1978 – June 1980
- Captain J. Julian R. Oswald: June 1980 – June 1982
- Captain Timothy M. Bevan: June 1982 – September 1984
- Captain George M. Tullis: September 1984–87
- Captain John R. Brigstocke: 1987–89
- Captain J. Robert Shiffner: 1989–91
- Captain Richard G. Hastilow: 1991–93
- Captain Simon Moore: 1993–95
- Captain (later Commodore) Anthony P. Masterton-Smith: 1995 – January 1998
- Commodore Roy A. G. Clare: January 1998–99
- Commodore Mark W. G. Kerr: 1999–2002
- Commodore C. Anthony Johnstone-Burt: 2002–04
- Commodore Richard J. Ibbotson: 2004–05
- Commodore Timothy Harris: 2005 – April 2007
- Commodore Martin B. Alabaster: April 2007 – September 2008
- Commodore Jake K. Moores: September 2008 – March 2011
- Commodore Simon P. Williams: March 2011 – September 2012
- Captain Jerry Kyd: September 2012 – February 2014
- Captain Henry Duffy: February 2014 – September 2016
- Captain Jolyon Woodard: September 2016 – September 2019
- Captain Roger Readwin: September 2019 – May 2022
- Captain Sarah Oakley: May 2022 – December 2023
- Captain Andrew Bray: December 2023 – July 2026
- Captain Simon Cox: July 2026 – Present

== See also ==
- Royal Naval College, Greenwich
- Royal Naval College, Osborne
- Royal Naval Academy
- Royal Hospital School
- St Vincent Squadron, a former division of the college
- King Fahd Naval Academy – Military naval college of Saudi Arabia, modelled on Britannia Royal Naval College.
