= Aston Webb House =

Listed building in London, England

Coordinates: 51°30′17″N 0°04′55″W

Aston Webb House is a Grade II listed building of historical note located in London. It is the converted General Office of Boord & Son's Distillery, which was built between 1899 and 1901 and designed by Aston Webb, an English architect who designed the principal facade of Buckingham Palace and the main building of the Victoria and Albert Museum.

== History ==
Aston Webb House was built in 1899–1901 on land purchased from Magdalen College, Oxford, and is the sole remnant of a huge industrial complex belonging to Boord & Son, a long-established firm of distillers that was established in 1726. From 1925, it appears the property was gradually occupied by other companies. In 2003 the building was redeveloped to provide "fourteen luxury apartments with a feature staircase set within an existing glazed galleried atrium".

== Location ==
The building is set back from the River Thames across from the City of London (London financial district), between London Bridge and Tower Bridge. It is on the doorstep of the More London development and London Bridge station and is a short walk from landmarks including Borough Market, Hays Galleria, The Shard, The Tower of London, and HMS Belfast.

== Style ==
The building was described by one Edwardian architectural commentator as follows:

In Tooley Street is the distillery of Messrs. Boord & Son, a building faced with picked yellow stocks and stone and red-brick dressings. The offices lie compact between circular turrets bound together by a string-course, becoming a cornice in the interval. These turrets, the entrance doorway, and the quality of the brickwork invest the structure with distinction even among bulky neighbours.

An English Heritage architectural report completed in 1999 notes:

The building is illustrative of Webb's early, pre-1900 career, which was characterised by eclecticism and variety of styles, including 'free Arts & Crafts', 'Jacobean', 'free Tudor', 'Franco-Flemish' and 'François Premier'. This period, which is generally regarded by critics as covering his more original work, saw not only the completion of famous public buildings, but of significant commercial and industrial buildings in London.

Executed in high quality yellow stocks with red-brick dressings and liberal use of stone for the entrance frontispiece, cornice and details, it is conceived in a Free Classical style. Distinction resides in the commanding rounded corner tourelles rising from ground to pointed conical slate roofs – a reference to Norman Shaw's New Scotland Yard. The original double-panelled wood doors, segmental-headed tripartite ground-floor windows, and square-headed flush-framed sashes above this, all survive intact.
