= Assistant Chief of the Naval Staff (Personnel) =

Office of the Assistant Chief of the Naval Staff (Personnel)
- Ensign of the Royal Navy
- Ministry of Defence
- Member of: Navy Command
- Reports to: Second Sea Lord
- Nominator: First Sea Lord and Chief of the Naval Staff
- Appointer: Prime Minister; Subject to formal approval by the King-in-Council
- Term length: Not fixed (typically 1–3 years)
- Inaugural holder: Rear-Admiral David Steel
- Formation: 2010-current

The Assistant Chief of the Naval Staff (Personnel) is a senior Royal Navy appointment responsible for the sustainable delivery of sufficient, capable and motivated personnel to the Naval Service in support of Defence Outcomes; he does this on behalf of the First Sea Lord and Chief of the Naval Staff. It has now subsumed under Director People and Training.

== History ==
The post was created in 2010 and held responsibility for the Personnel Division that consisted of 800 staff and was responsible for all aspects (non-operational) of personnel within the Naval Service. In his current role the admiral is responsible for the sustainable delivery of sufficient, capable and motivated personnel to the Naval Service in support of Defence Outcomes. The admiral is accountable for all aspects (non-operational) of Naval Service personnel (including reserve personnel).

In this role he supported in the delivery of his outcomes in relation to personnel by the Commodore Naval Strategy Personnel (CPNS), the Commodore Naval Personnel and the Assistant Chief of Staff Medical (titled in official sources) as used under the ACNS (Personnel) who is simultaneously Head of the Royal Navy Medical Service.

Captain Mike Young is currently in charge of recruiting.

== Additional titles ==
During the period 2010 to 2015 the office holder jointly held additional the titles of Naval Secretary and Chief Naval Logistics Officer (as head the Naval Logistics Branch).

From 2016 to present this appointee jointly holds the titles of Naval Secretary and now Flag Officer, Maritime Reserves.

== Assistant Chiefs of the Naval Staff (Personnel) ==
Included:

- April 2010–September 2012: Rear-Admiral David Steel
- September 2012–March 2015: Rear-Admiral Jonathan Woodcock
- March 2015-2018: Rear-Admiral Simon Williams
- June 2018-May 2020: Rear-Admiral Michael Bath

== Assistant Chiefs of the Naval Staff (Personnel) ==
- January 2020-:Rear-Admiral Philip Hally

== Sources ==
1. "Assistant Chief of Naval Staff (Personnel) and Commodore Devonport Flotilla visit HMS Monmouth in Bahrain | Royal Navy". www.royalnavy.mod.uk. Ministry of Defence Royal Navy UK. 26 March 2013. Retrieved 9 February 2019.
2. Government, HM (30 April 2018). "Transparency data Navy Command senior, as of April 2017 Updated 30 April 2018". gov.uk. Ministry of Defence UK. Retrieved 11 January 2019.
3. Mackie, Colin (January 2019). "Royal Navy Senior Appointments from 1865" (PDF). gulabin.com. C. Mackie.
4. Office, Cabinet (2012–2013). Civil service yearbook (49 ed.). London, England: The Stationery Office: Dandy Booksellers Ltd. ISBN 9781905262878.
5. Office, Cabinet (2016–2017). Civil Service Year Book (53 ed.). London, England: The Stationery Office:Dandy Book Sellers Ltd. ISBN 9781787320345.
