= Aston Webb =

English architect (1849–1930)

Sir Aston Webb GCVO CB RA FRIBA
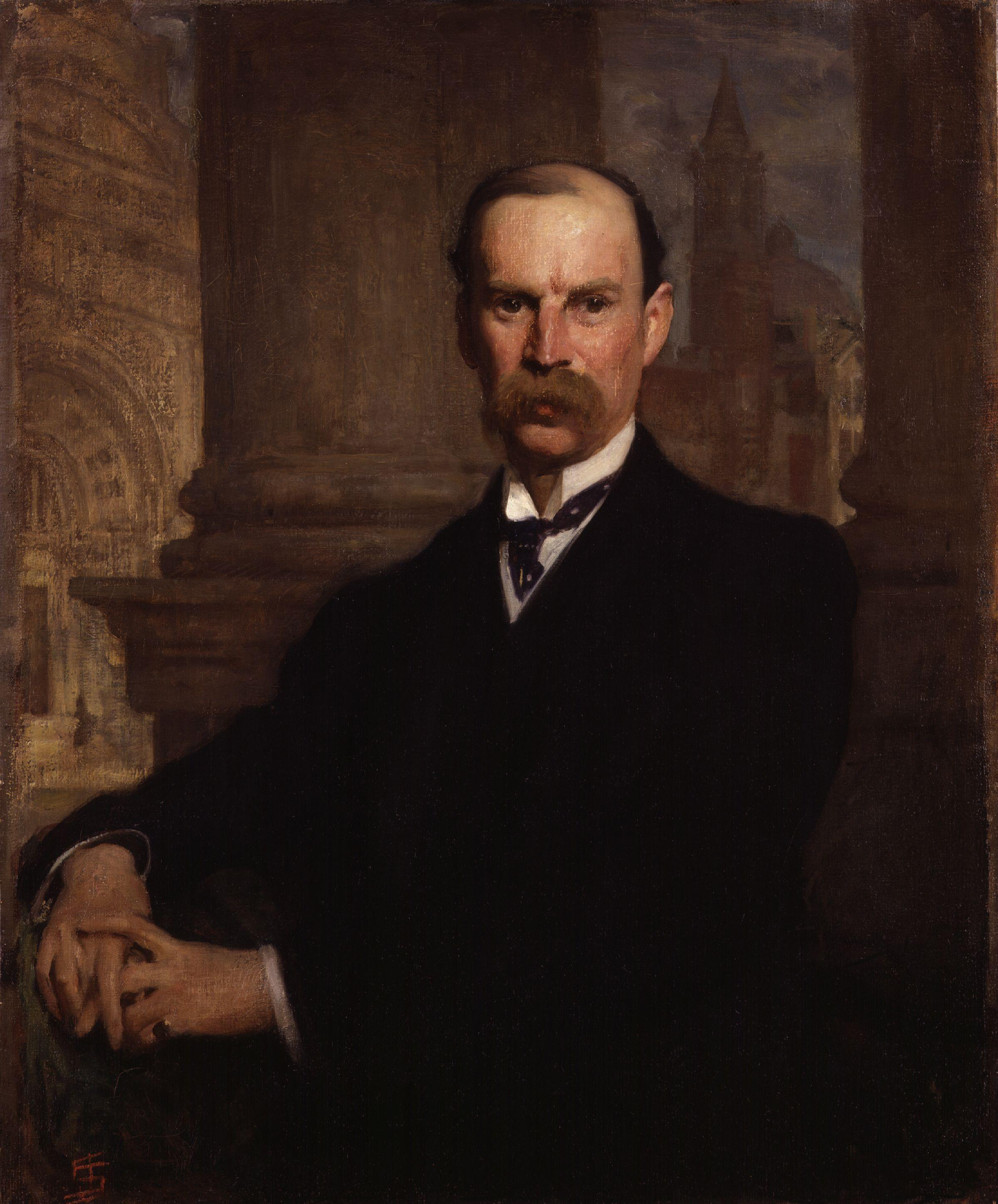
- Sir Aston Webb, portrait by Solomon Joseph Solomon, c. 1906
- Born: 22 May 1849; Clapham, London, England
- Died: 21 August 1930 (aged 81); Kensington, London, England
- Occupation: Architect
- Children: Maurice and Philip Edward Webb
- Awards: RIBA Royal Gold Medal (1905); AIA Gold Medal (1907); RSA Albert Medal (1927)
- Buildings: University of Birmingham

Sir Aston Webb, GCVO, CB, RA, FRIBA (22 May 1849 – 21 August 1930) was a British architect who designed the principal facade of Buckingham Palace and the main building of the Victoria and Albert Museum, among other major works around England, many of them in partnership with Ingress Bell. He was president of the Royal Academy from 1919 to 1924. He was also the founding chairman of the London Society.

== Life ==
The son of a watercolourist (and former pupil of the landscape artist David Cox), Edward Webb, Aston Webb was born in Clapham, south London, on 22 May 1849 and received his initial architectural training articled in the firm of Banks and Barry from 1866 to 1871, after which he spent a year travelling in Europe and Asia. He returned to London in 1874 to set up his own practice.

From the early 1880s, he joined the Royal Institute of British Architects (1883) and began working in partnership with Ingress Bell (1836–1914). Their first major commission was a winning design for the Victoria Law Courts in Birmingham (1886), the first of numerous public building schemes the pair designed over the next 23 years. Towards the end of his career, Webb was assisted by his sons, Maurice and Philip. Ralph Knott, who designed London's County Hall, began his work as an apprentice to Webb executing the drawings for his competition entries.

He died, aged 81, in Kensington, London, on 21 August 1930.

=== Honours and awards ===
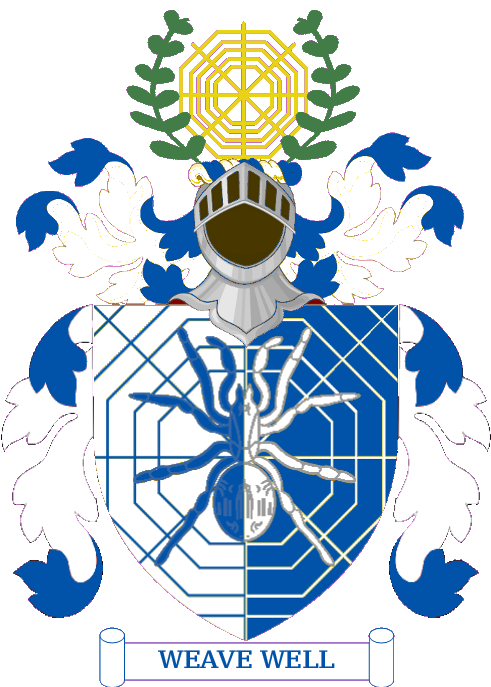
Webb's coat of arms.

He served as RIBA president (1902–1904) and, having been elected as a full member of the Royal Academy in 1903, served as acting president from 1919 to 1924. He received the Royal Gold Medal for Architecture in 1905 and was the first recipient of the American Institute of Architects Gold Medal in 1907. He was the first chairman of the London Society in 1912.

He was knighted in 1904, appointed a Companion of the Order of the Bath in 1909; and appointed to the Royal Victorian Order as Commander in 1911, promoted to Knight Commander in 1914 and Knight Grand Cross in 1925.

In 2011, after being selected by local residents, a new traffic relief boulevard constructed in proximity to the University of Birmingham was named after Webb.

== Works ==
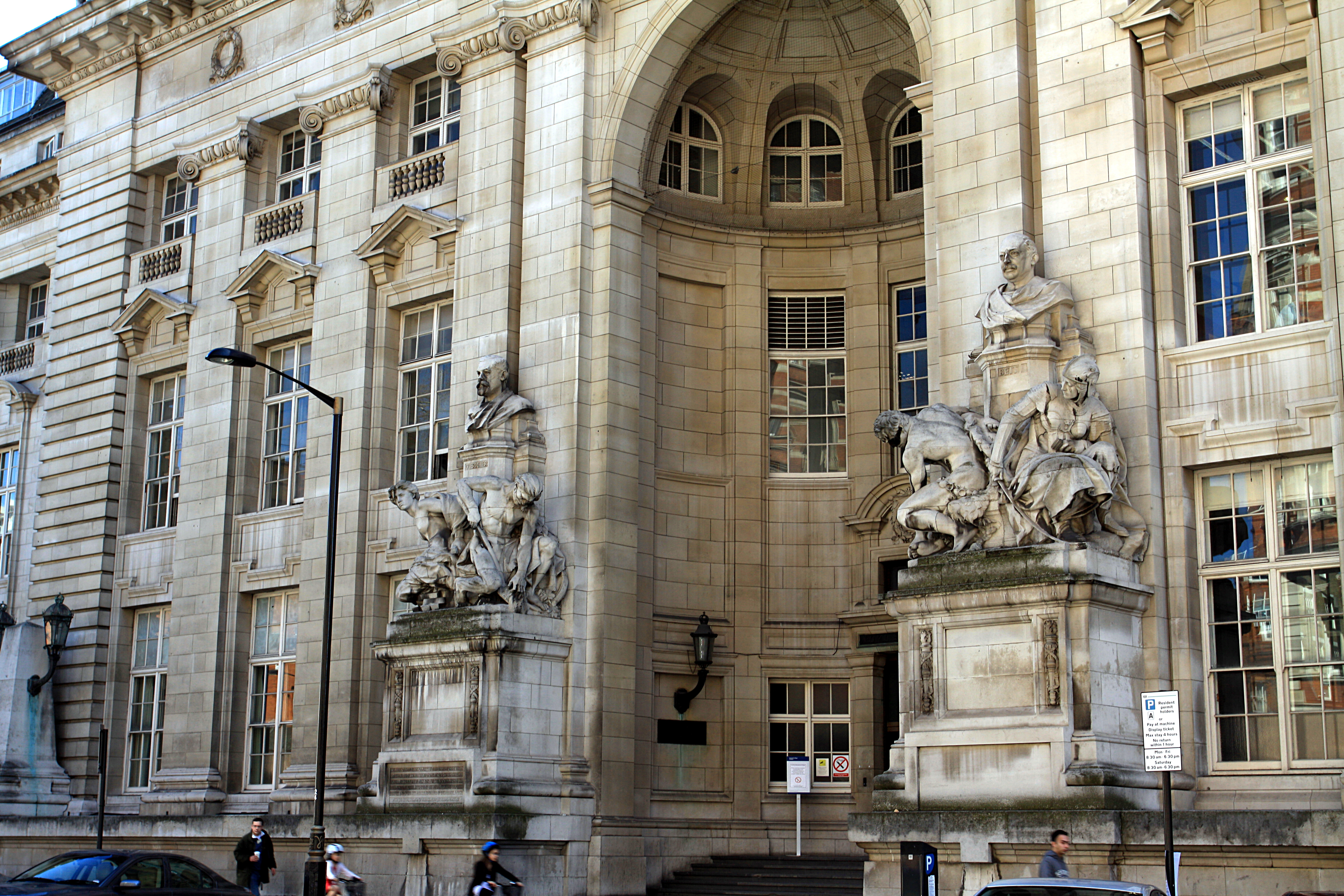
Imperial College London

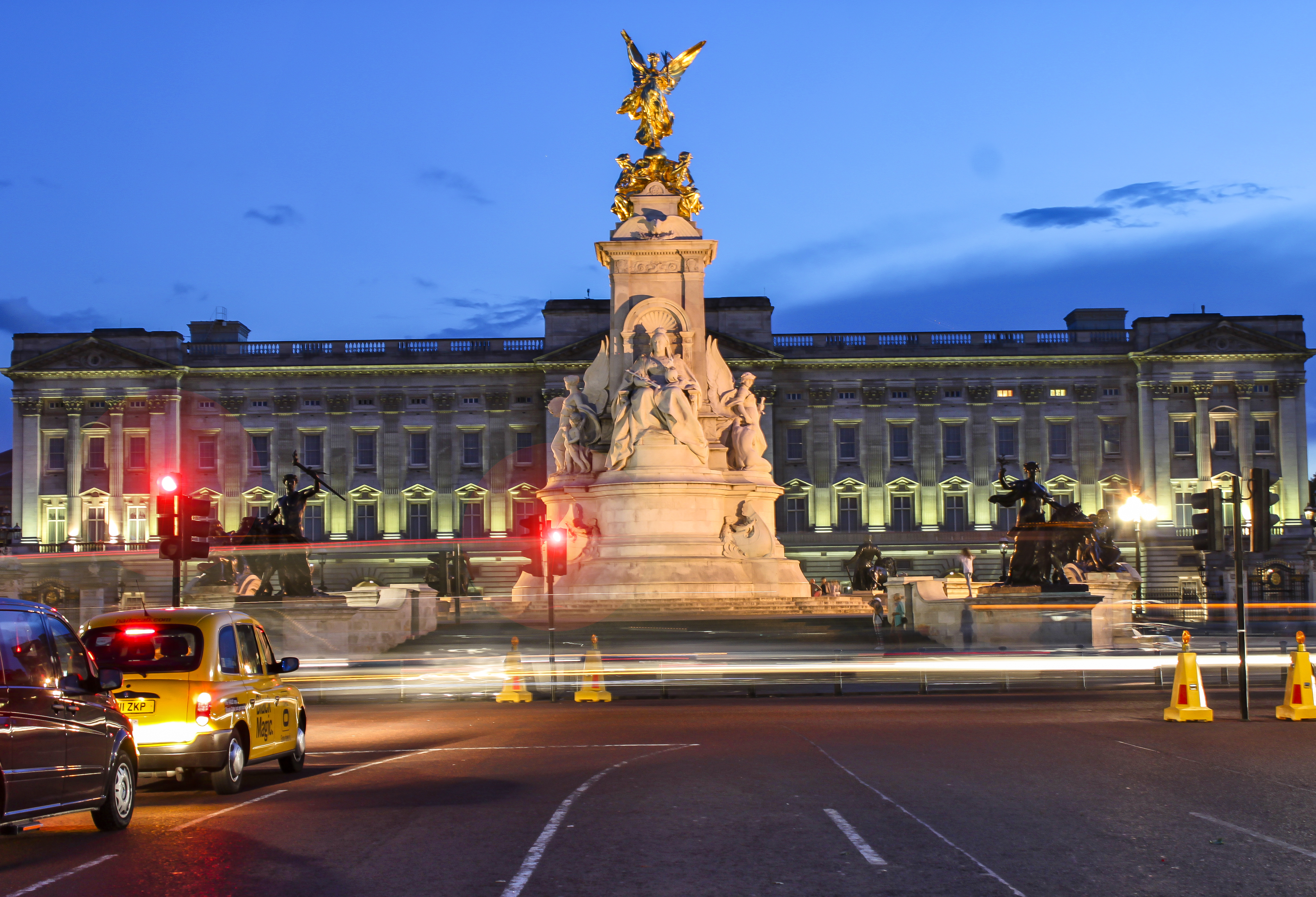
Buckingham Palace and the Victoria Memorial

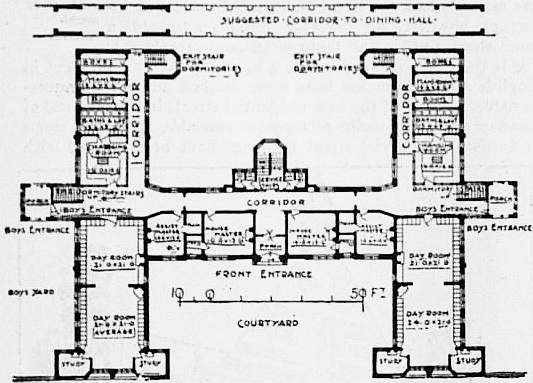
A drawing showing Plan of a Master's House, New Christ's Hospital (Webb and Bell).

One of his earliest works was built for the Six Masters of the Royal Grammar School Worcester in 1877. These almshouses are in the Arts and Crafts style, different from his later work.

In 1881 he designed North Breache Manor in Surrey. A small country house in the Tudor Gothic manner, but with Arts and Crafts detailing, it was one of the largest and most extravagant of his private contracts from this earlier period.

Webb's first major work was the restoration of the medieval St Bartholomew-the-Great in Smithfield, London. His brother Edward Alfred Webb was the churchwarden at the time, and his association with the church probably helped the young architect get the job. In London, Webb's best-known works include the Queen Victoria Memorial and The Mall approach to, and the principal façade of, Buckingham Palace, which he re-designed in 1913.

Webb also designed the Victoria and Albert Museum's main building (designed 1891, opened 1909), the Royal United Services Institute, Whitehall (1893–95), and – as part of The Mall scheme – Admiralty Arch (1908–09). He also designed the Britannia Royal Naval College, Devon, where Royal Naval officers are still trained. He enlarged and sympathetically restored the perpendicular Church of St John Baptist, Claines, Worcester, finishing in 1886. Nearby he was also responsible for the new church of St. George, consecrated in 1895, which replaced an earlier smaller building in St. George's Square, Barbourne, Worcester. With his partner Ingress Bell, he extended St Andrew's Church, in Fulham Fields, London, remodelled the chancel, built the Lady Chapel, and designed the rood screen.

He also designed the Holy Trinity Cathedral in Accra, Ghana.

Other educational commissions included the new buildings of Christ's Hospital in Horsham, Sussex (1893–1902), the Royal College of Science, South Kensington (1900–06), King's College, Cambridge (1908), the Royal School of Mines, South Kensington (1909–13), Royal Russell School, Coombe, Croydon, Surrey, and the Royal College of Science for Ireland which now houses the Irish Government Buildings.

Residential commissions included Nos 2 (The Gables) and 4 (Windermere) Blackheath Park, in Blackheath, south-east London. He also designed (1895–96) a library wing, including the Cedar Library, at The Hendre, a large Victorian mansion in Monmouthshire, for John Rolls, 1st Baron Llangattock.

In March 1889 the consistory of the French Protestant Church of London commissioned Webb to design a new church. It was erected in 1891–93 at 8–9 Soho Square in London. The church is one of Webb's Gothic school works.

In 1892 Webb, with Ingress Bell, designed the Newfoundland Museum in St. John's in the classical revival style.

At Mumford's Mill in Deptford, southeast London, with Ingress Bell, Webb designed a grain silo built in 1897 on the eastern side of Deptford Creek.

In 1901 Webb designed the headquarters for a brewery at 115 Tooley Street, London, recently converted into 14 apartments as "Aston Webb House". This was done as part of the development of More London.

Weetman Pearson, 1st Viscount Cowdray, commissioned Webb to undertake major extensions to his property, Dunecht House, Aberdeenshire, which were carried out c. 1913–20.

At the University of Birmingham (1900–1912), the whole of the original scheme, in the Byzantine style, was the product of the Webb-Bell partnership. This consisted of a curved building with five radial blocks. The central building of Chancellor's Court containing the Great Hall is named after Aston Webb. The main feature is a large dome that sits atop the entrance loggia. The two radial blocks to each side were to be teaching blocks for various engineering disciplines; but the easternmost was not built until the Bramall Music Building was added roughly a century later. The scheme also included the straight run of buildings to the north completing the 'D' shape. Originally these were the physics and chemistry departments, and the Harding Memorial Library. The scheme was set off by the free standing clock tower ("Old Joe") over 100 metres high and the tallest structure in Birmingham until 1966.

Sir Aston Webb also designed the chapels of Worksop College, Nottinghamshire (1911) and Ellesmere College, Shropshire (1926), both of which are Woodard Schools.

== Gallery of architectural work ==
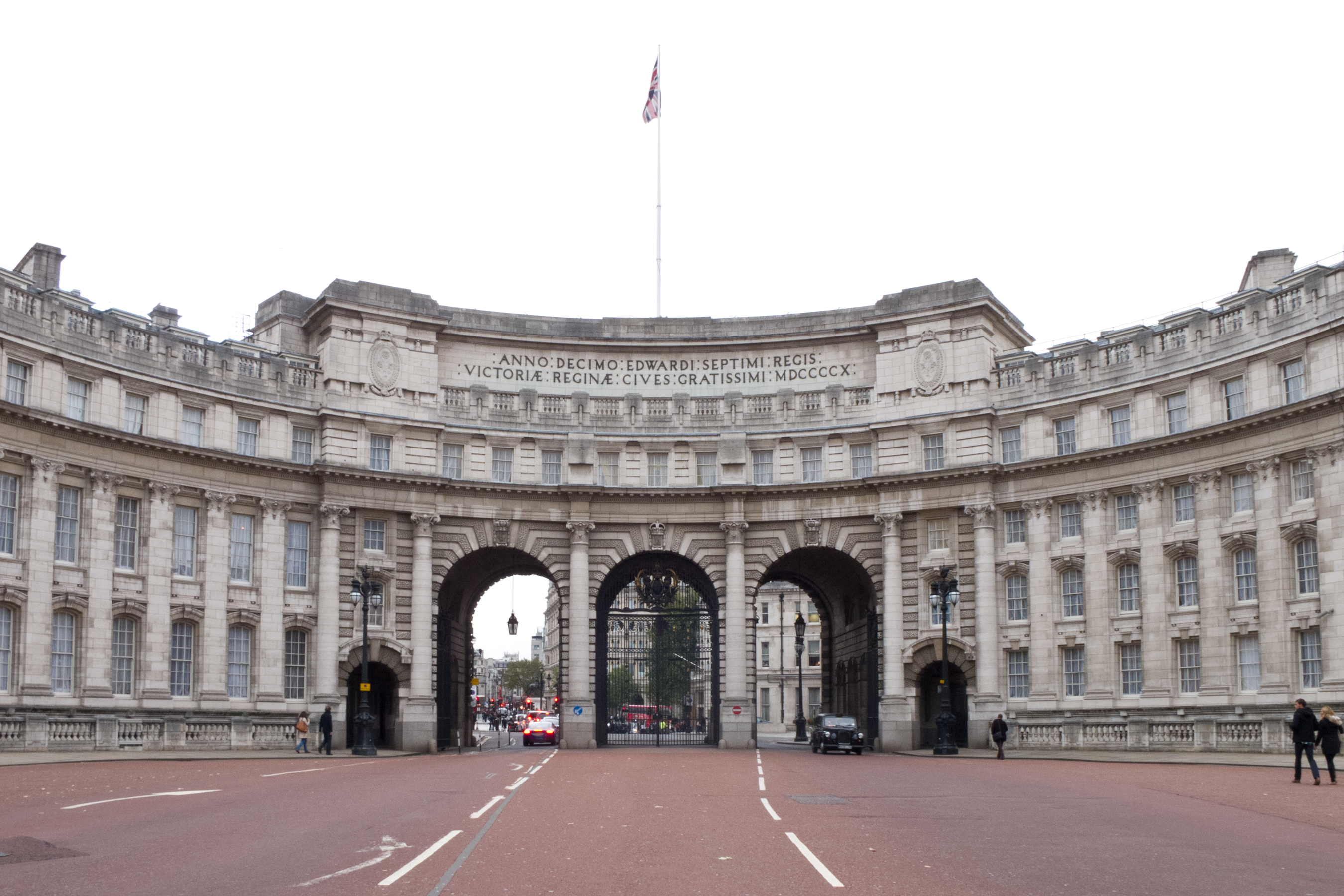
Admiralty Arch, The Mall, London

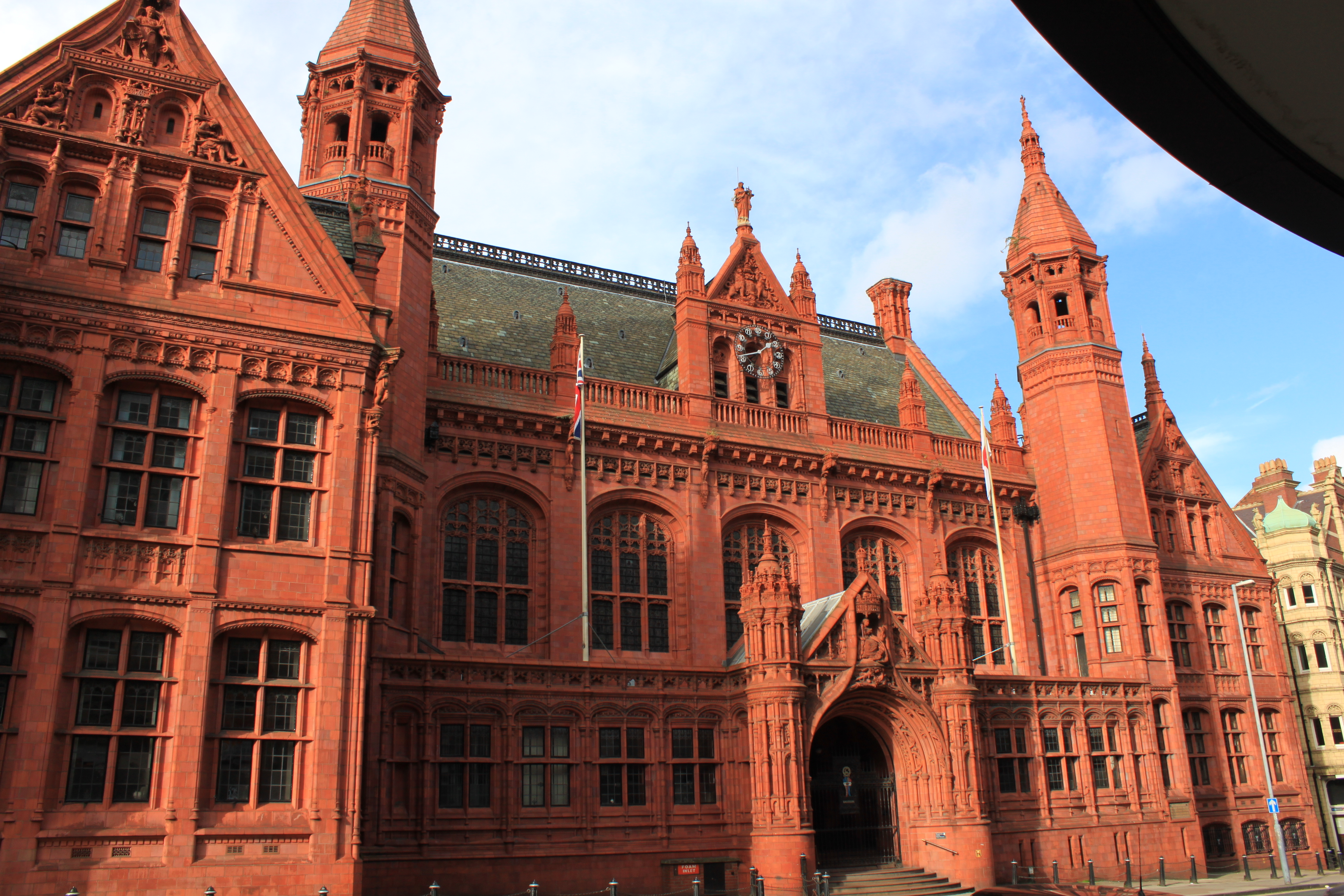
Victoria Law Courts, Birmingham

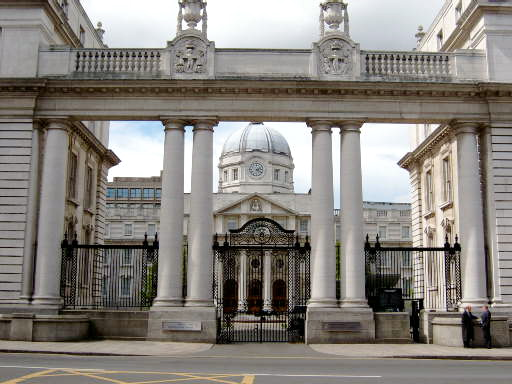
Government Buildings, Dublin, Ireland

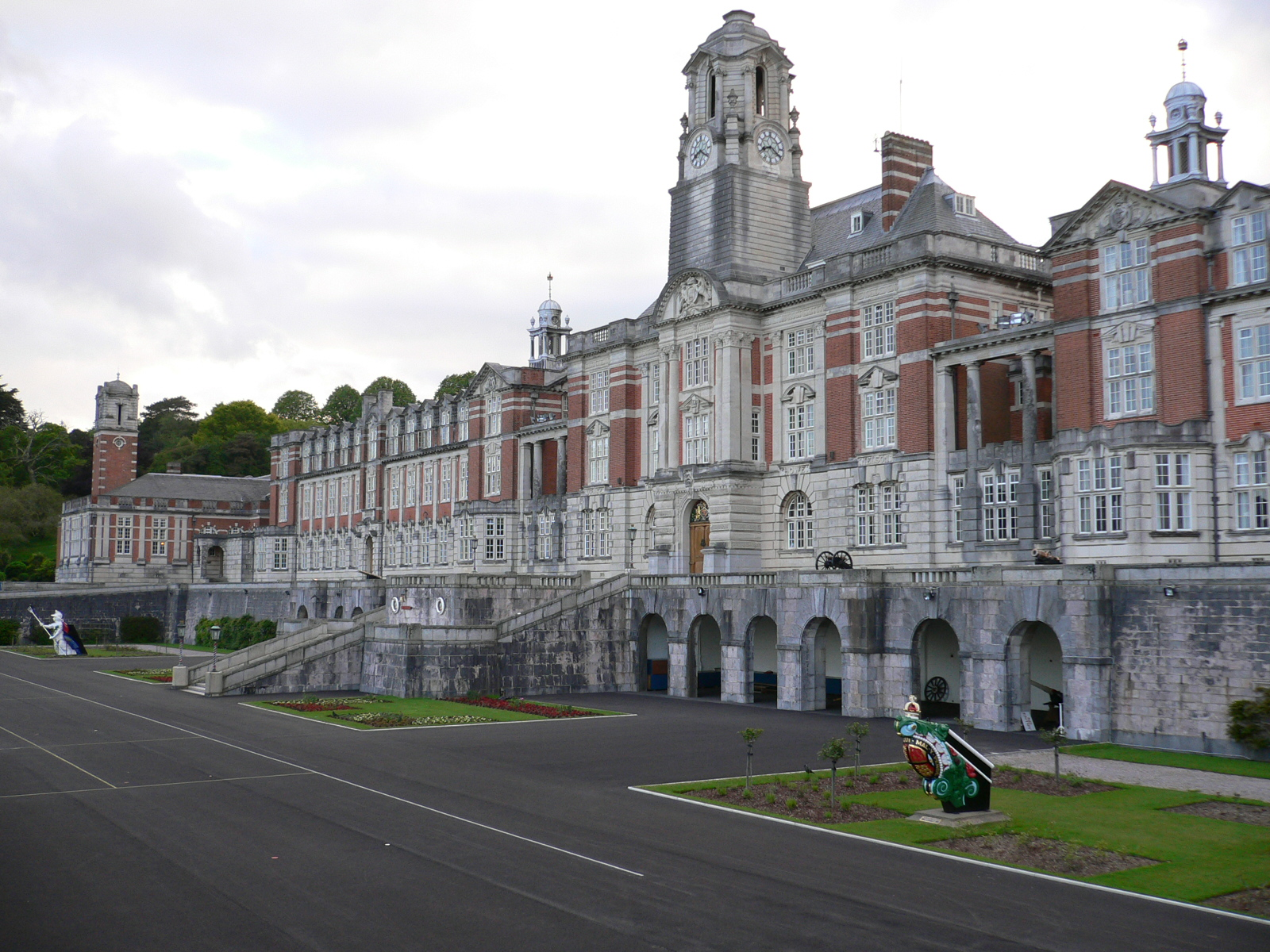
Britannia Royal Naval College, Dartmouth, Devon

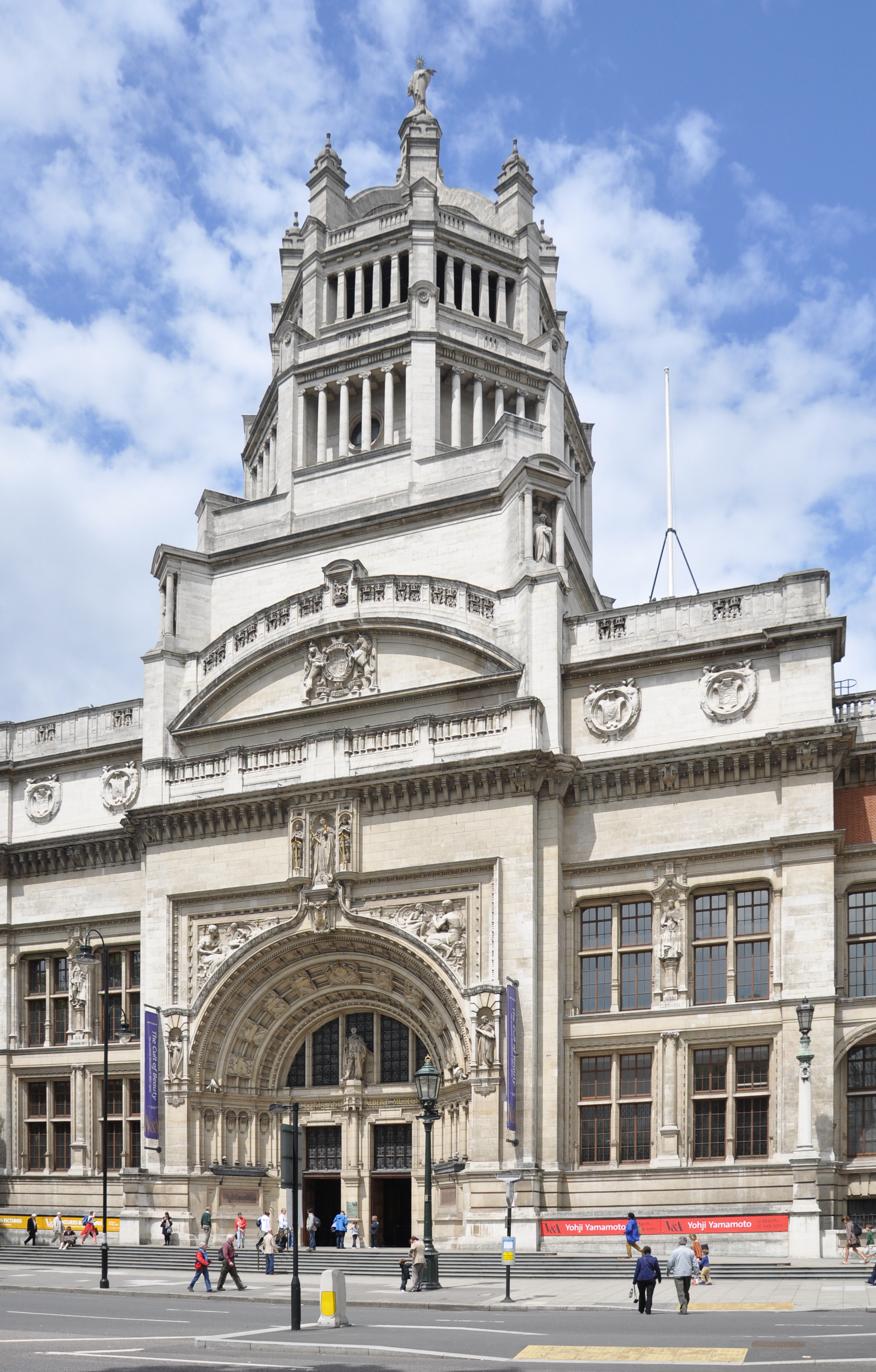
Main entrance, Victoria and Albert Museum, South Kensington, London

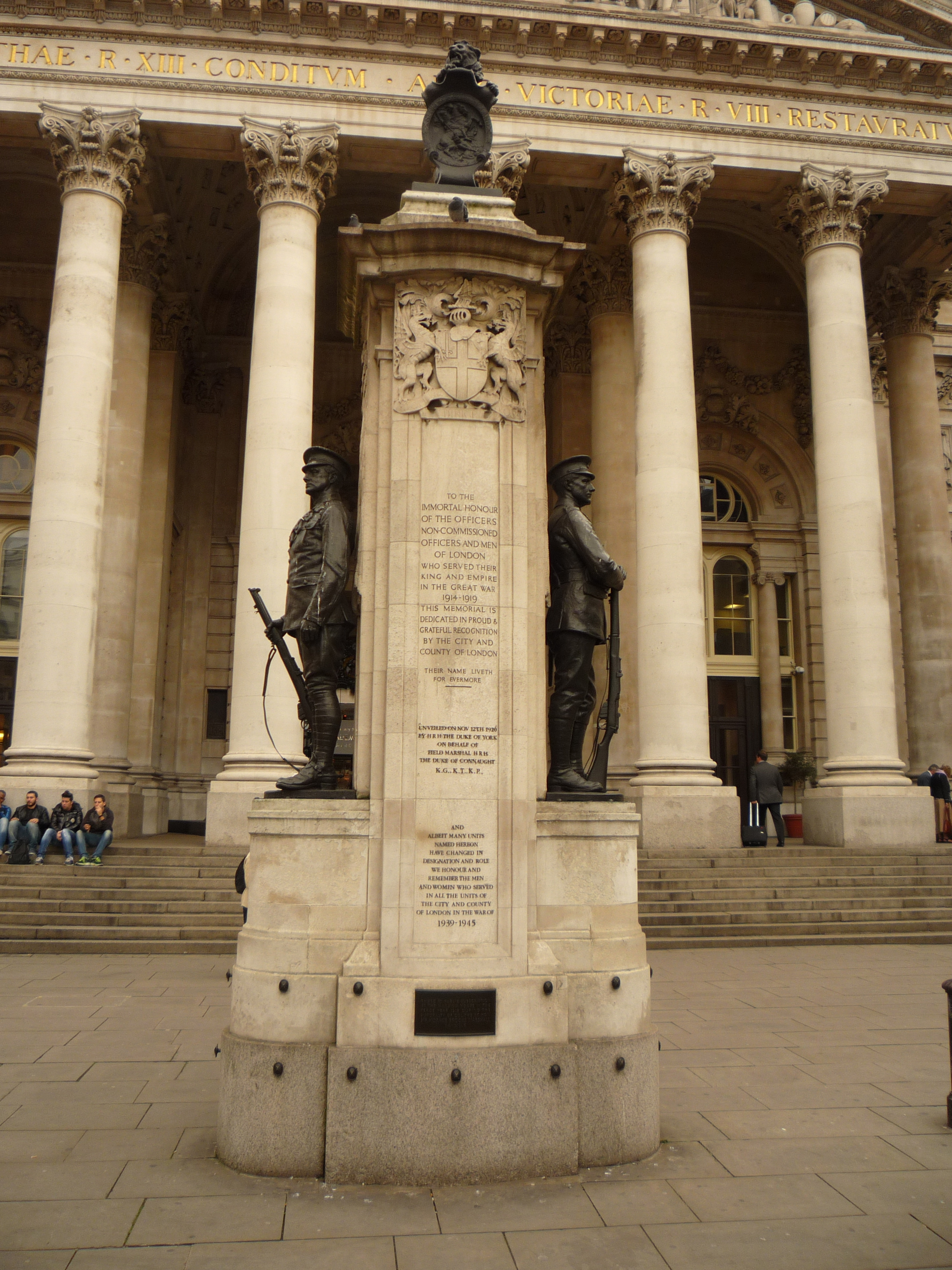
The London Troops war memorial, Royal Exchange, sculpture by Alfred Drury

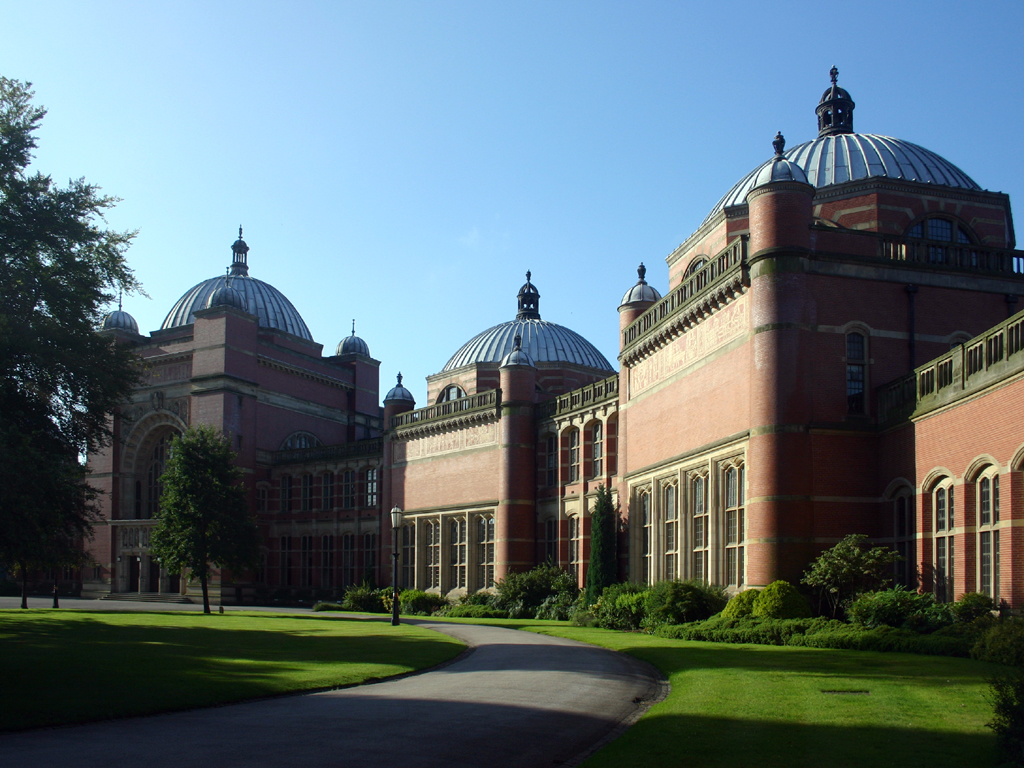
Aston Webb building, University of Birmingham

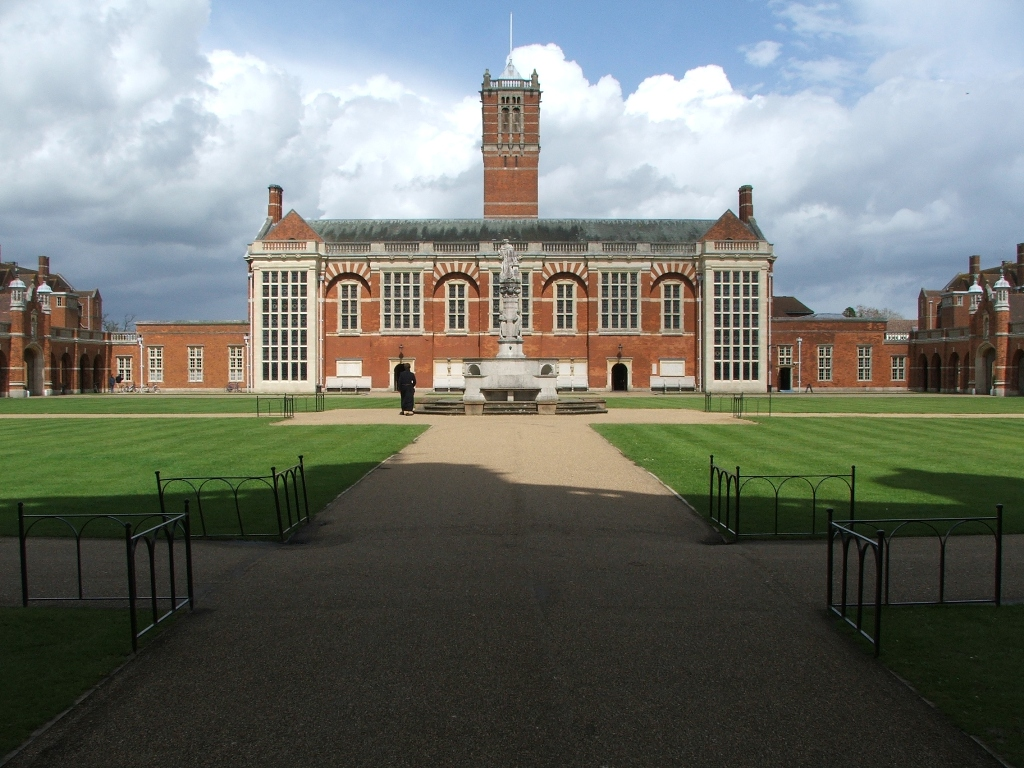
Quad, Christ's Hospital in Horsham, West Sussex

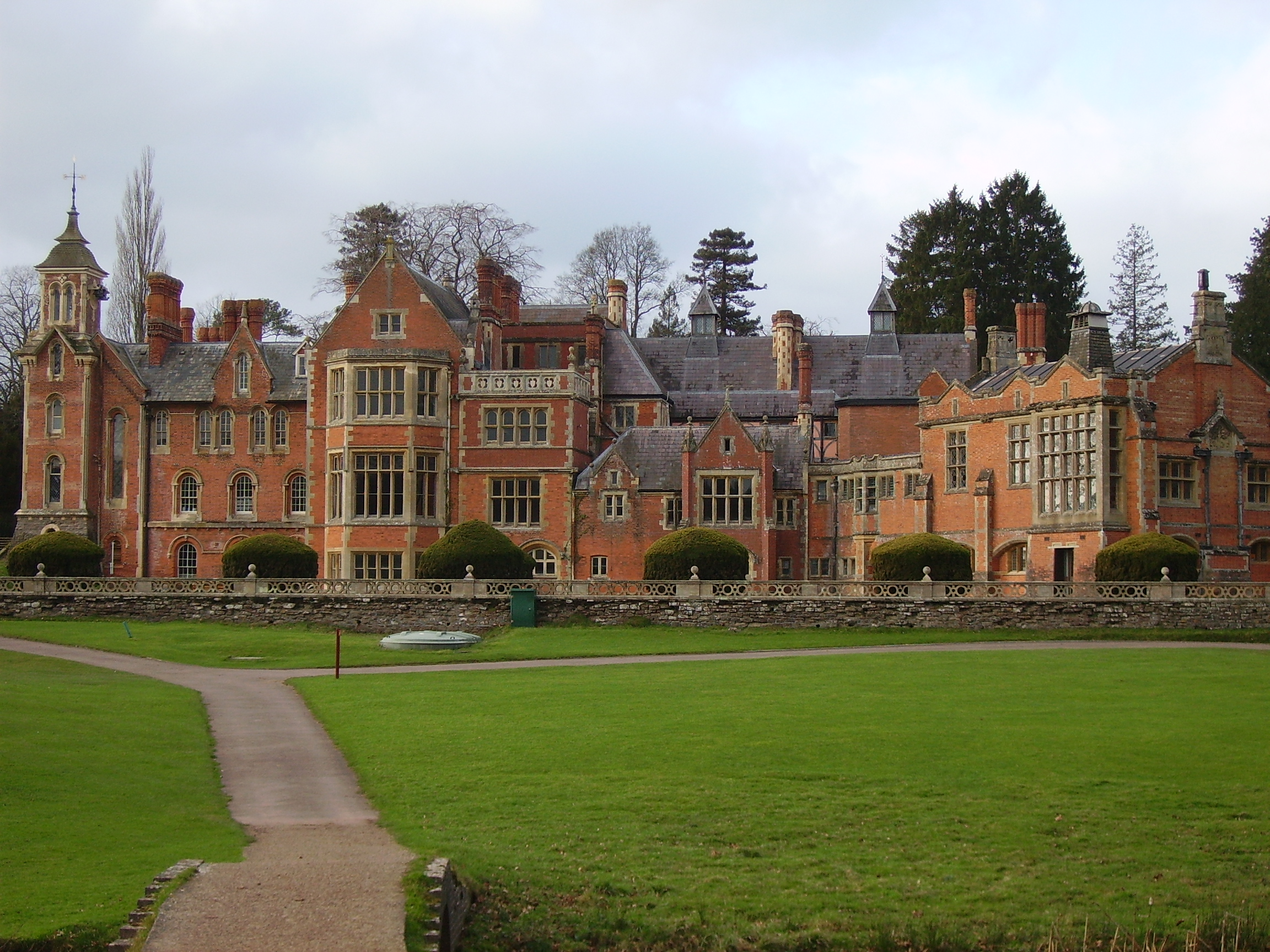
The Hendre, Monmouthshire, Wales

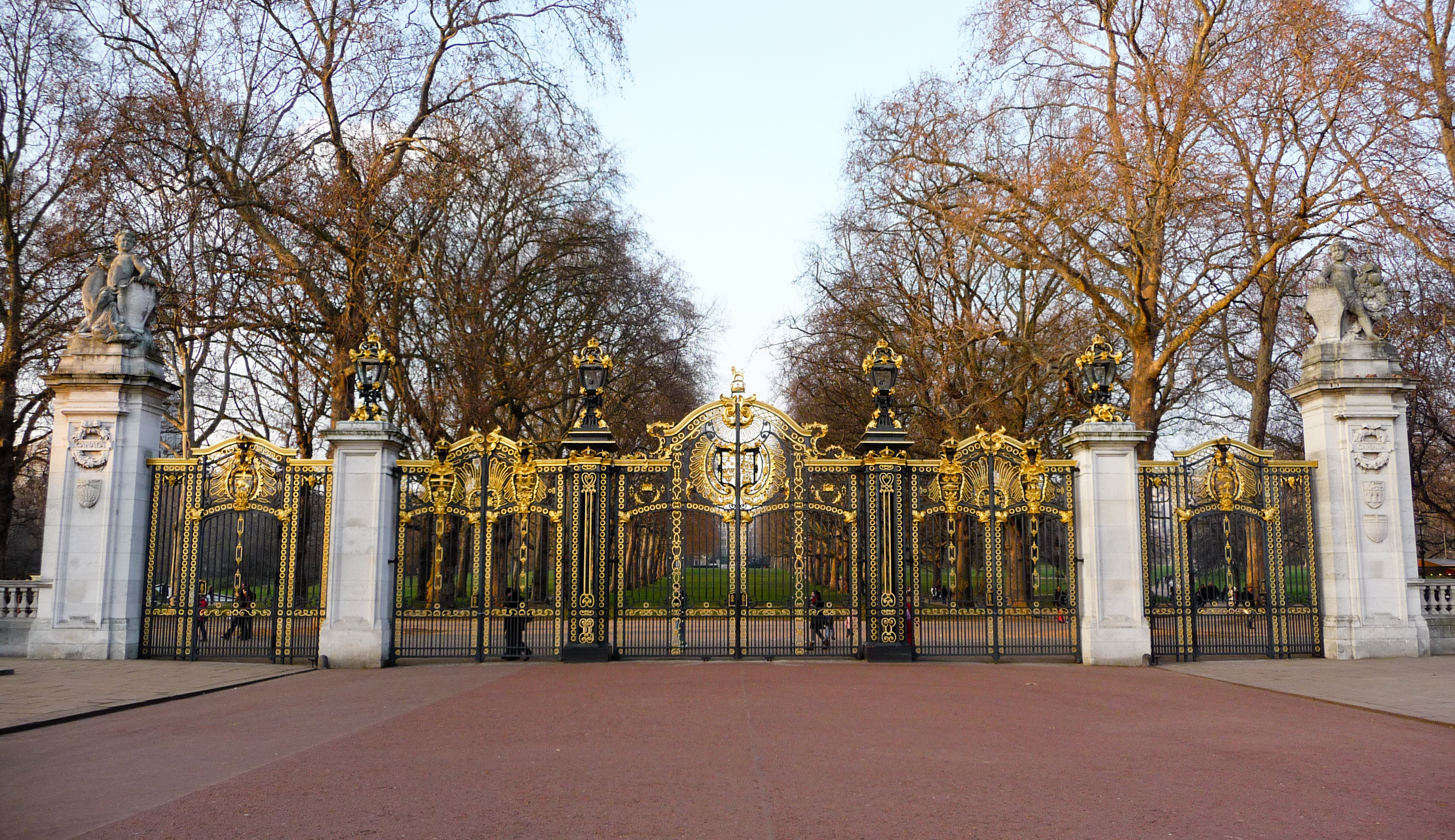
Canada Gate, London

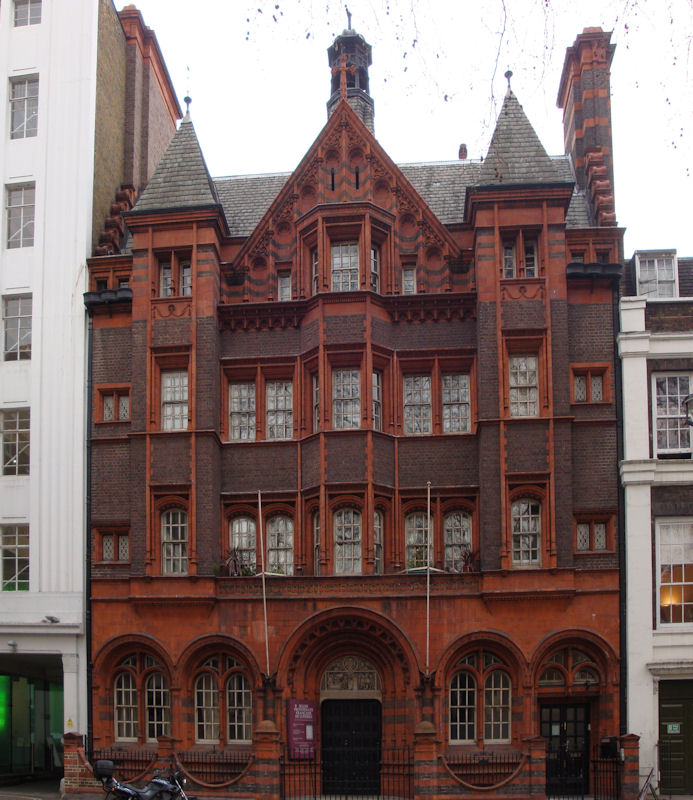
French Protestant Church, Soho Square

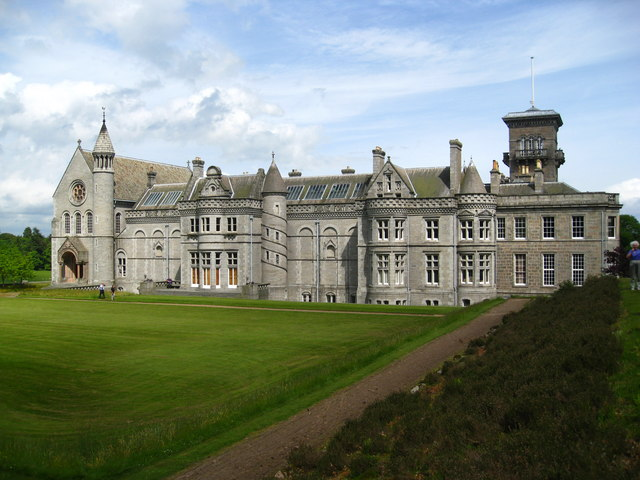
Dunecht House, Aberdeenshire

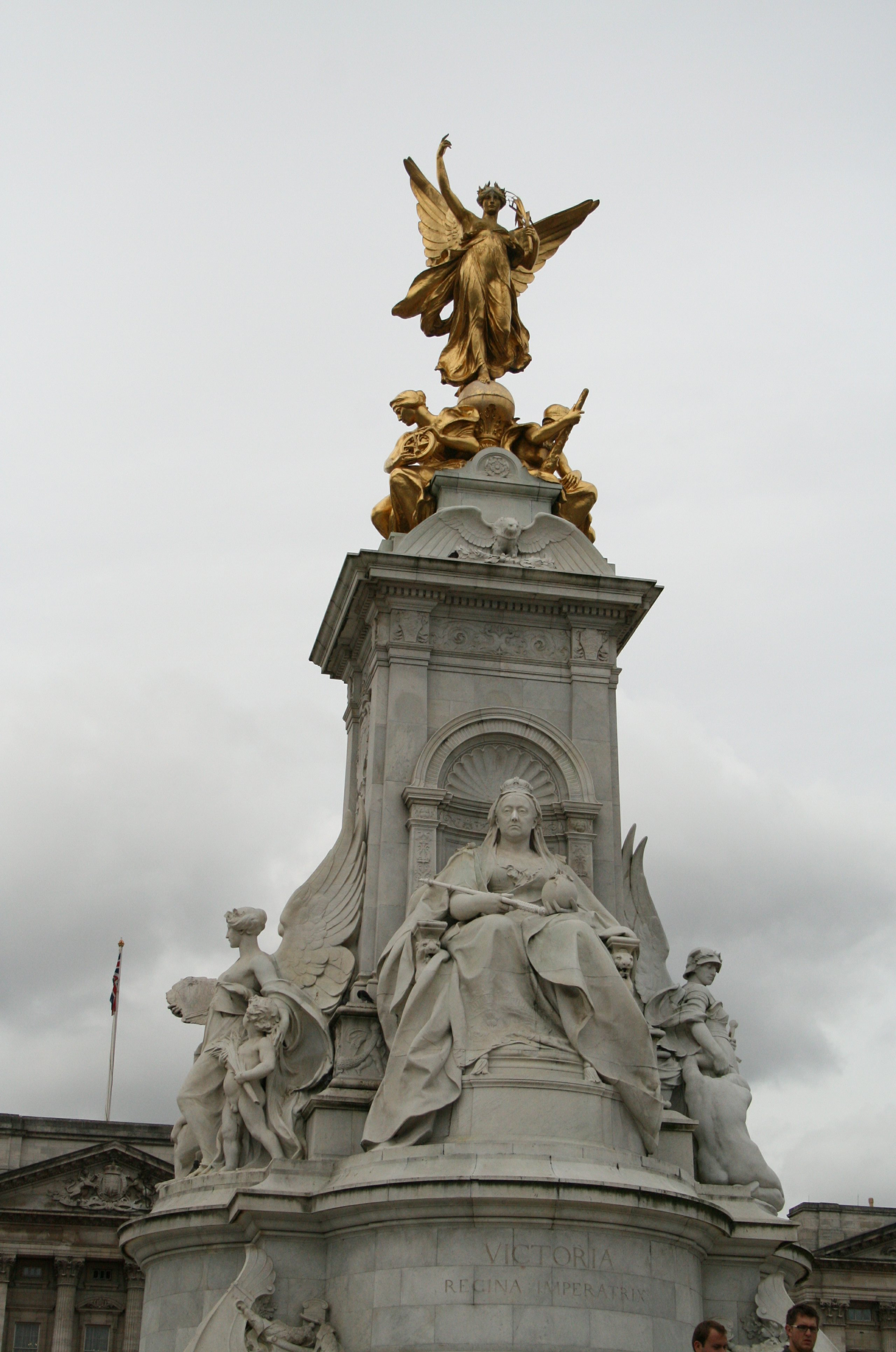
The Victoria Memorial, The Mall, London

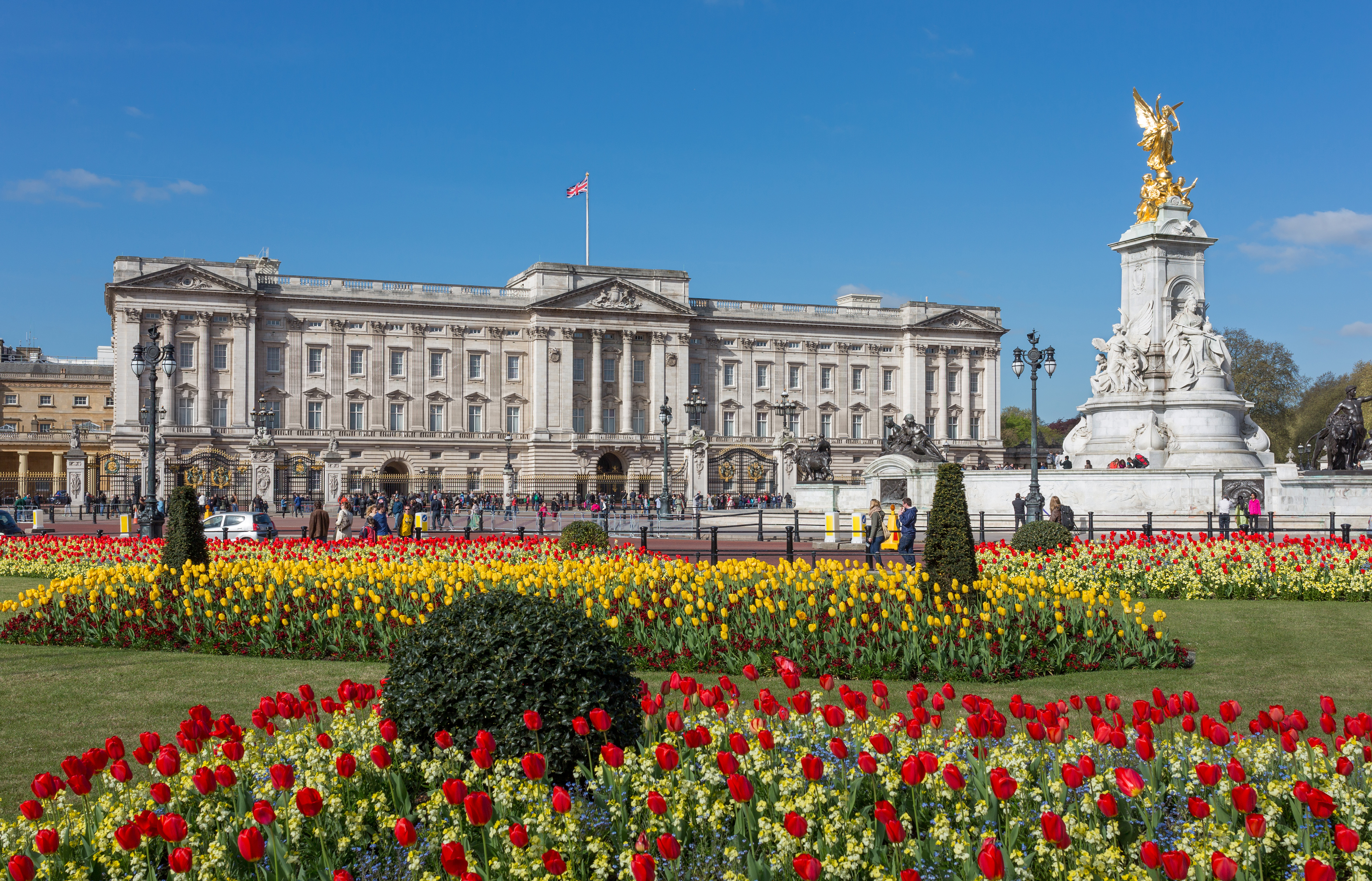
Buckingham Palace East Front, as redesigned in 1913 by Webb.

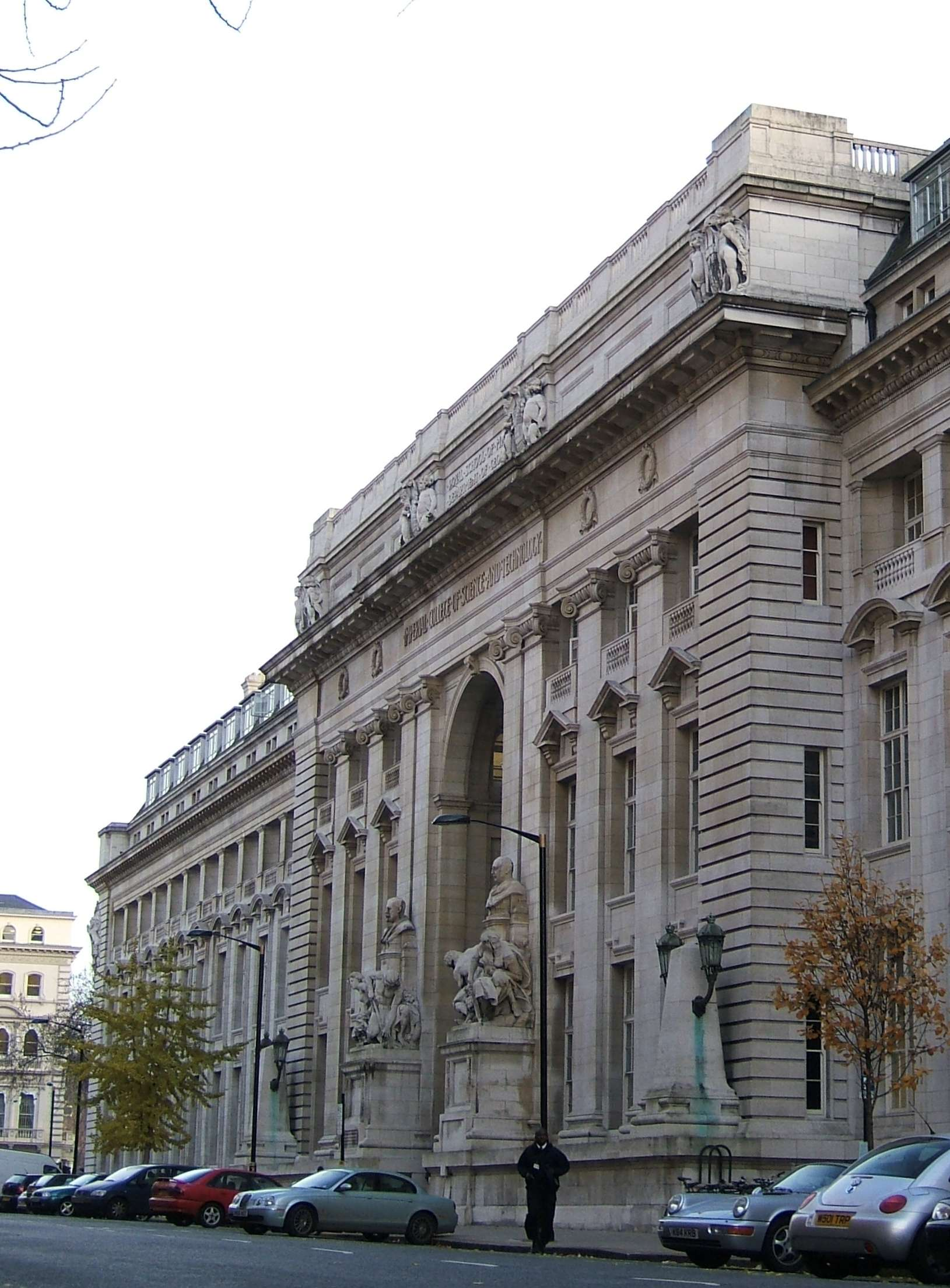
Royal School of Mines, Imperial College, London

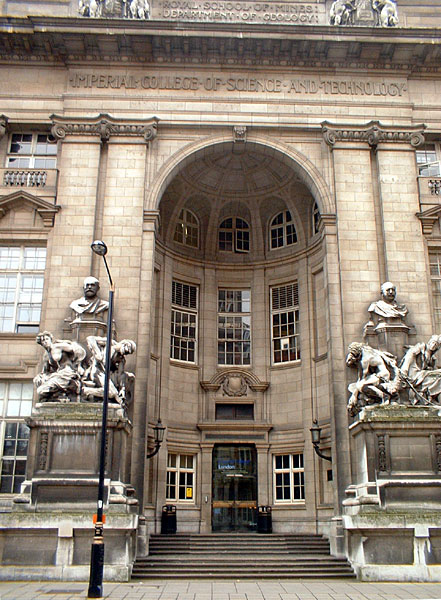
Detail of main entrance of the Royal School of Mines

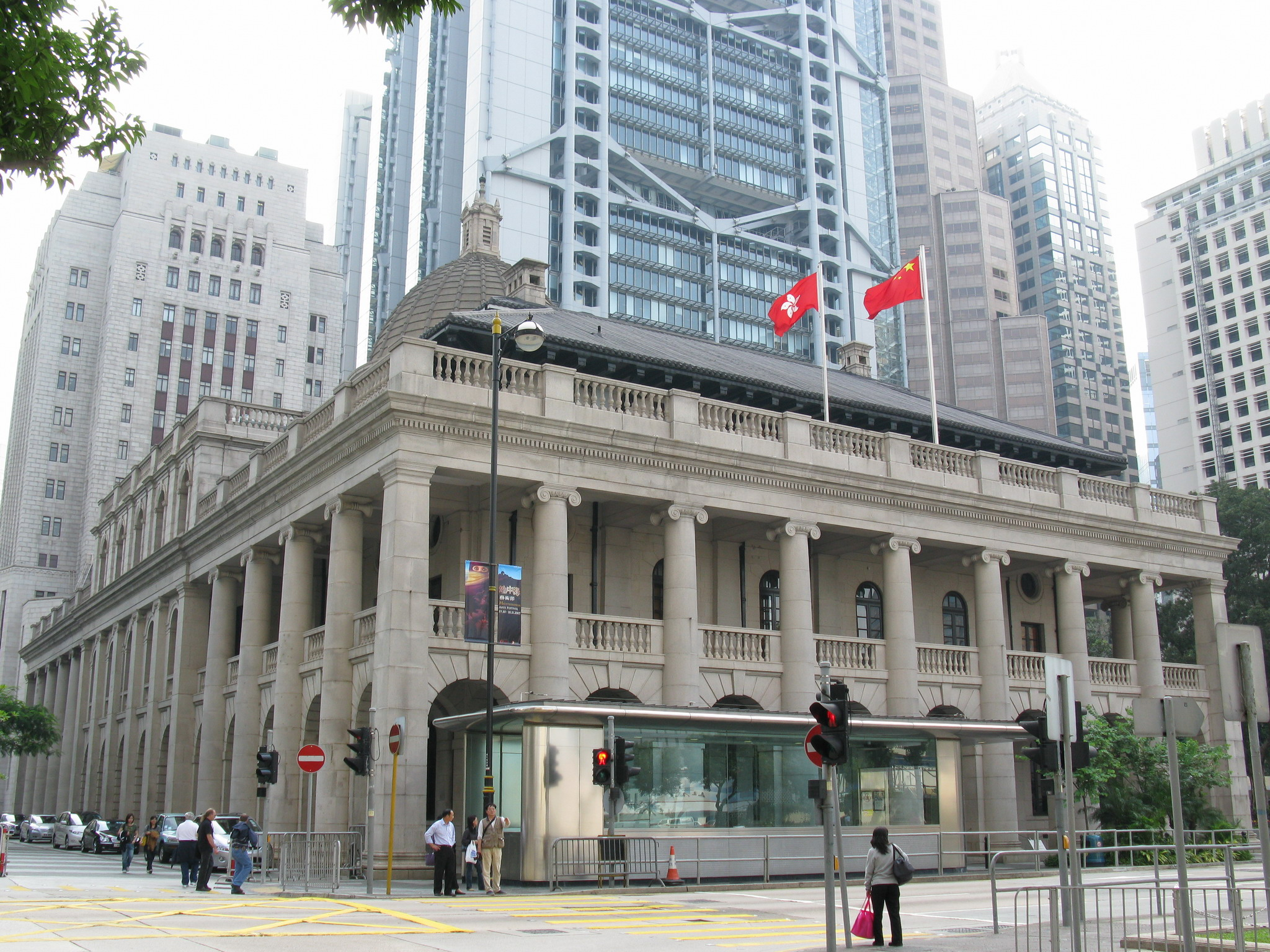
Court of Final Appeal Building, Hong Kong

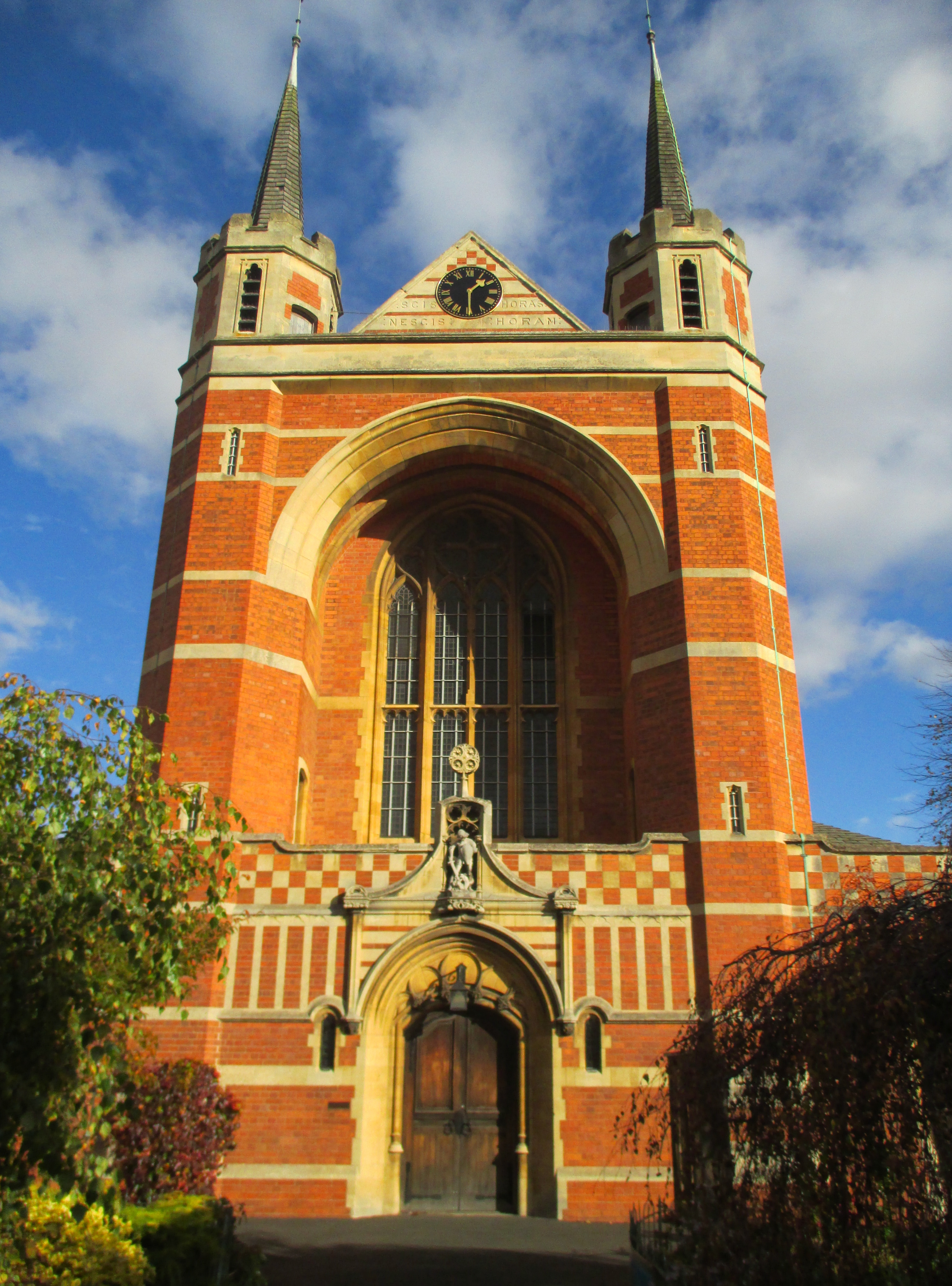
St George's church, Barbourne, Worcester

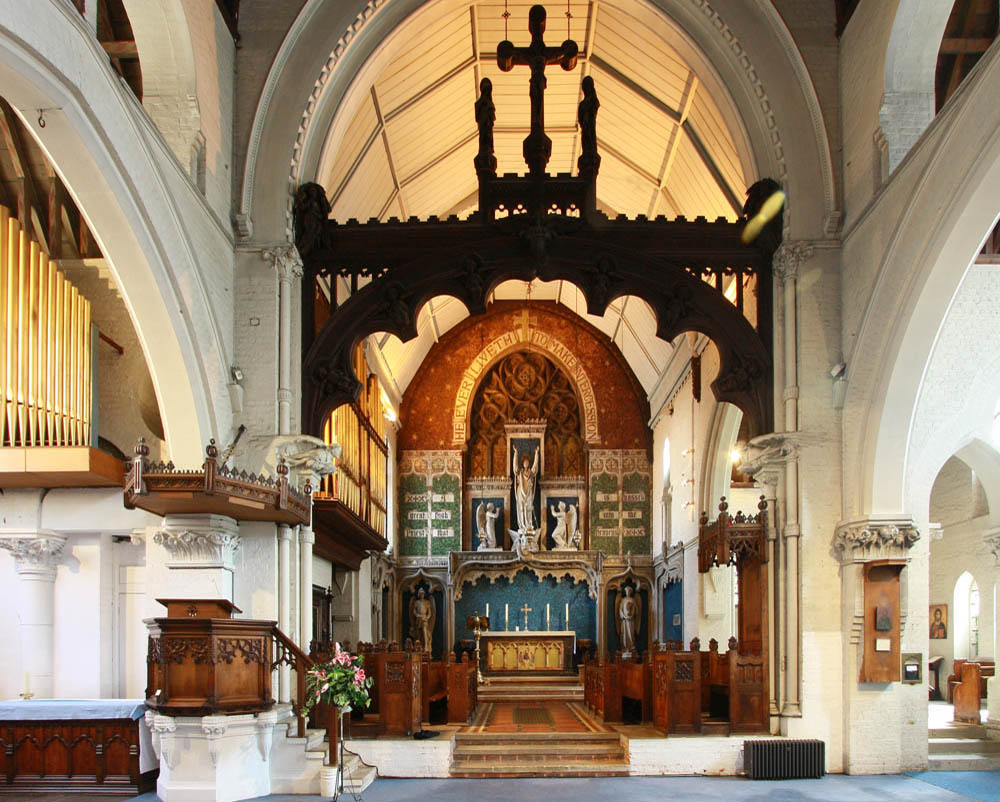
St Andrew's Church, Fulham, London. This is the rood screen, designed by Sir Aston Webb.

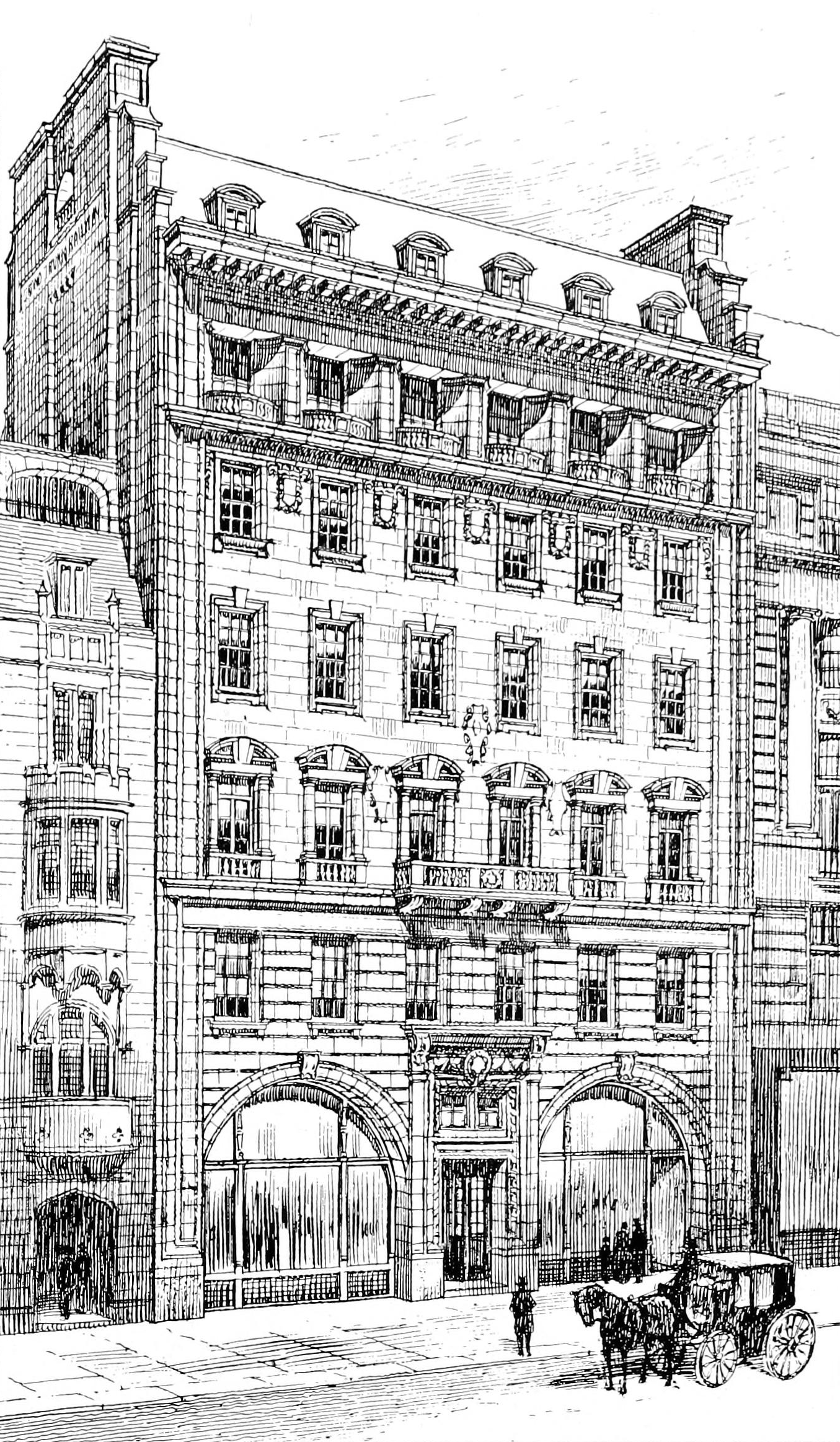
Head office of the Grand Trunk Railway, 17-19 Cockspur Street

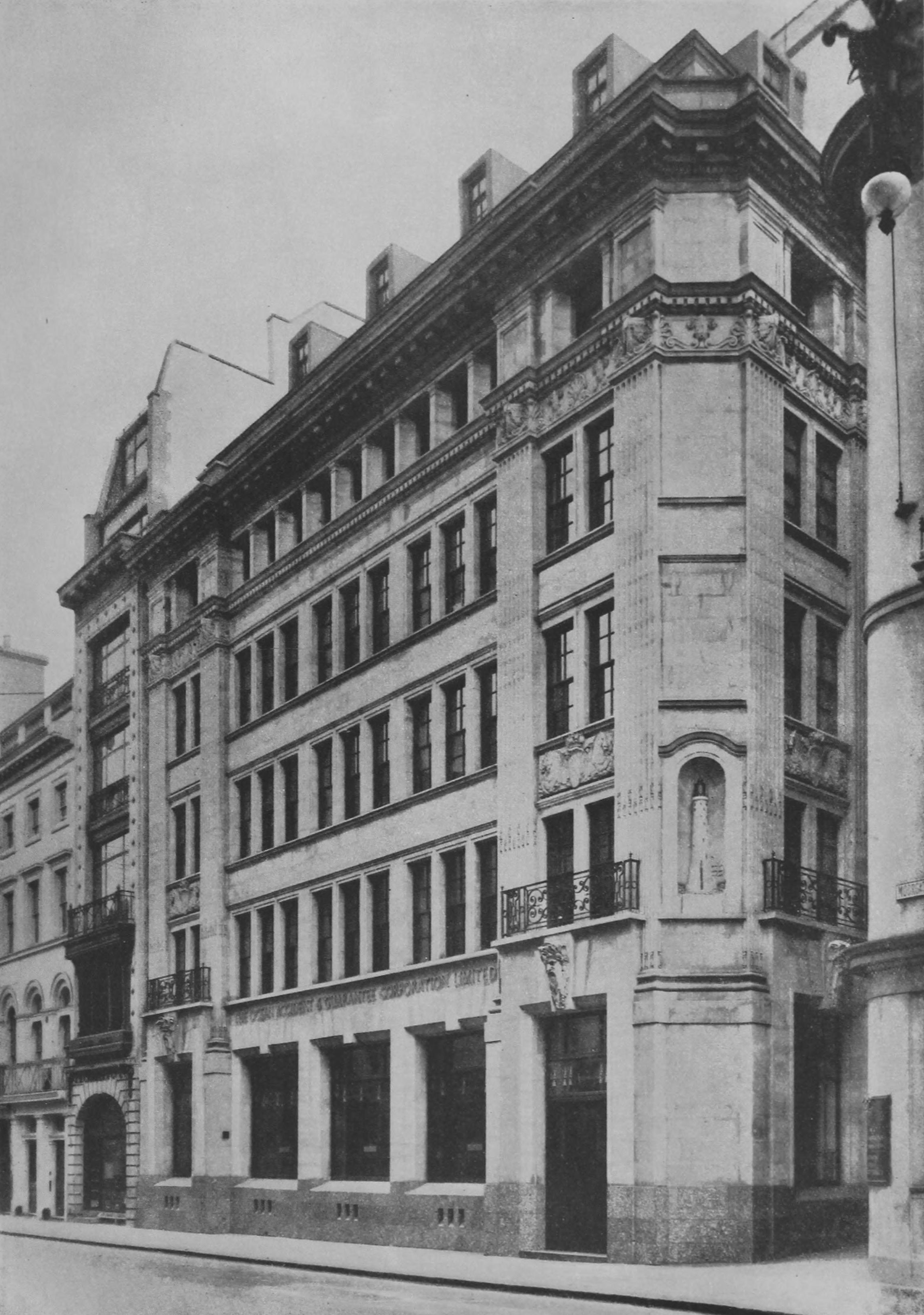
Ocean Accident & Guarantee Corporation, 42 Moorgate, London

== Notes ==
Cultural offices
Preceded by Sir Edward Poynter, Bt	President of the Royal Academy; 1919–1924	Succeeded by Frank Dicksee
