= Michael Young (educationalist) =

British educational theorist and sociologist

Professor Michael FD Young
- Occupation: Education researcher
- Known for: Sociology of education

Emeritus Professor Michael FD Young is a British educational theorist and sociologist, at the UCL Institute of Education. Young's research investigates the nature of knowledge and the curriculum implications this investigation gives rise to. He is best known for the theory of powerful knowledge which navigates the issue of access to systematic and specialised knowledge as a key concern for justice. This theory has had impact on curriculum particularly in the UK, although its intent is contested.

Young studied Natural Sciences at the University of Cambridge, and while teaching secondary science completing a second undergraduate Sociology degree. At the University of Essex, he was a student of Basil Bernstein while undertaking an MA in sociology, then moving to the Institute of Education, University of London (where Bernstein held his Professorship). Young has authored a number of books on the area of knowledge and curriculum.
