= Kuwait Maastricht Business School =

Internationally accredited business school in Kuwait

- كلية كويت - ماسترخت لإدارة الأعمـال
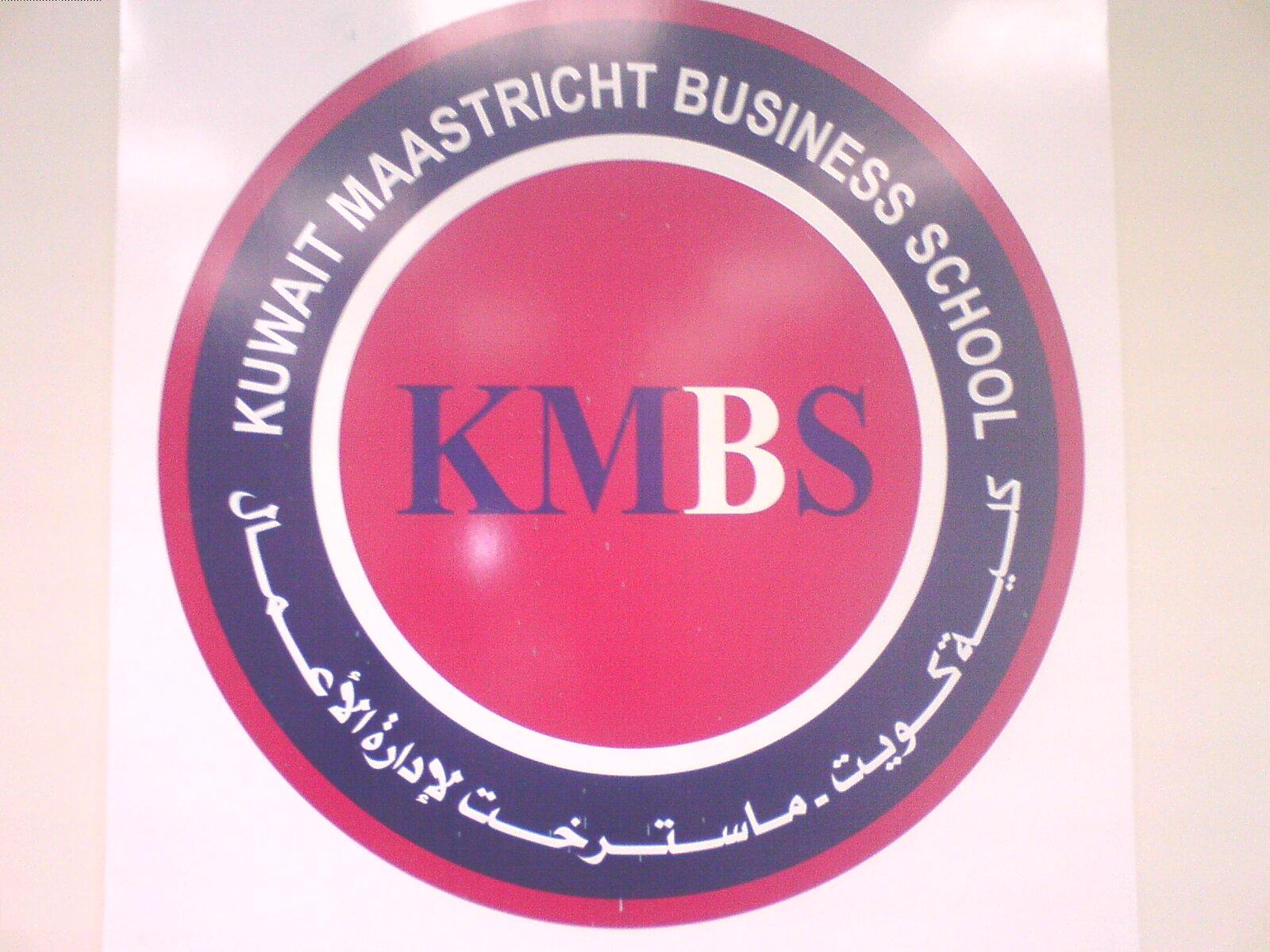
- Type: Private
- Active: 2003–2014

The Kuwait-Maastricht Business School (KMBS) is a private business college in Kuwait City, Kuwait. Founded in 2003, it is the Kuwaiti counterpart of the Maastricht School of Management (MSM) in the Netherlands. KMBS offers the first private graduate level Master of Business Administration (MBA) degree in Kuwait. KMBS has been accredited by the Association of MBAs. As of 2013, KMBS is the only internationally accredited business school in Kuwait, and the degree is recognized world-wide.

KMBS was licensed by the Council for Private Universities in February 2003, and Amiri Decree No. 140 (2003). Programmes commenced in October 2003 (Intake one) and since that date we have registered more than 1300 students and have graduated 700. In 2006, KMBS/MSM were awarded international accreditation by AMBA (Association of MBAs), and in 2007 KMBS was awarded Institutional Accreditation by the Ministry of Higher Education, Private Universities Council. KMBS was thus the FIRST MBA provider in Kuwait, and offers the ONLY Internationally Accredited MBA programme in Kuwait. The MBA degree is awarded by MSM as a European MBA – internationally recognized and accredited.

Having its campus in Dasma, professors from abroad are the main instructors. Professors from MSM in the Netherlands come and deliver lectures, and the Graduation Ceremony is presided by the Dean of MSM.

Classes are held 3 days a week, 3 hours a day. There are 2 time slots conducted per week.

This MBA course is part-time, and is mainly aimed at working professionals, who can dedicate their time for this MBA after their work hours. Assignments are done at the end of each course, either individually or in groups (depending on the instructors). There is a canteen within the campus.They have a 3 month summer vacation during July, August and September. Because student numbers are restricted, KMBS provides an elite, personal atmosphere in which every student is given a high level of attention and service.

KMBS has a well established relationship with the National Bank of Kuwait, who recruit some of the top students who graduate every year.

A new sprawling campus was planned, to be built in the Fintas region.

List of Convocations held by KMBS:

2013 - Al-Hashemi Hall, Radisson Blu Hotel, Salwa (7th Graduation Ceremony, on 18 May 2013)

2012 - Arraya Ballroom, Marriott Hotel, Sharq (6th Graduation Ceremony, on 25 March 2012)

2010 - Al-Hashemi Hall, Radisson Blu Hotel, Salwa (4th Graduation Ceremony, on 18 May 2010)

2009 - Al-Hashemi Hall, Radisson Blu Hotel, Salwa (3rd Graduation Ceremony, on 10 May 2009)

== See also ==
- List of universities in Kuwait
