= Kuwait College of Science and Technology =

Private university in Doha District, Kuwait

Kuwait College of Science & Technology
- Type: Private
- Established: 2008; 17 years ago
- President: Khalid Al-Begain
- Location: Doha District, Al Asimah Governorate, Kuwait; 29.3242°N 47.7883°E
- Website: www.kcst.edu.kw

Kuwait College of Science and Technology (KCST) is a private university in Kuwait. KCST is located in Doha District, west of Kuwait City. KCST started its degree programs in 2016. Its operations are regulated by the Private Universities Council (PUC) of Kuwait.

The university campus is in Doha District, Al Asimah Governorate, near the border with Al Jahra Governorate, and the former Camp Doha. It is owned by The Company of Science and Technology for Higher Education (COSTHE). Laboratory facilities include physics labs, electronics and instrumentation labs, and computing labs.

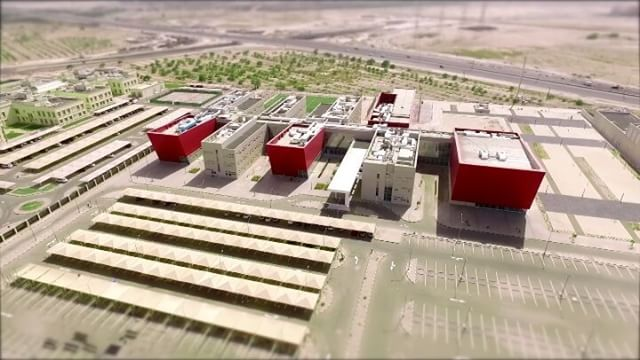
Aerial view

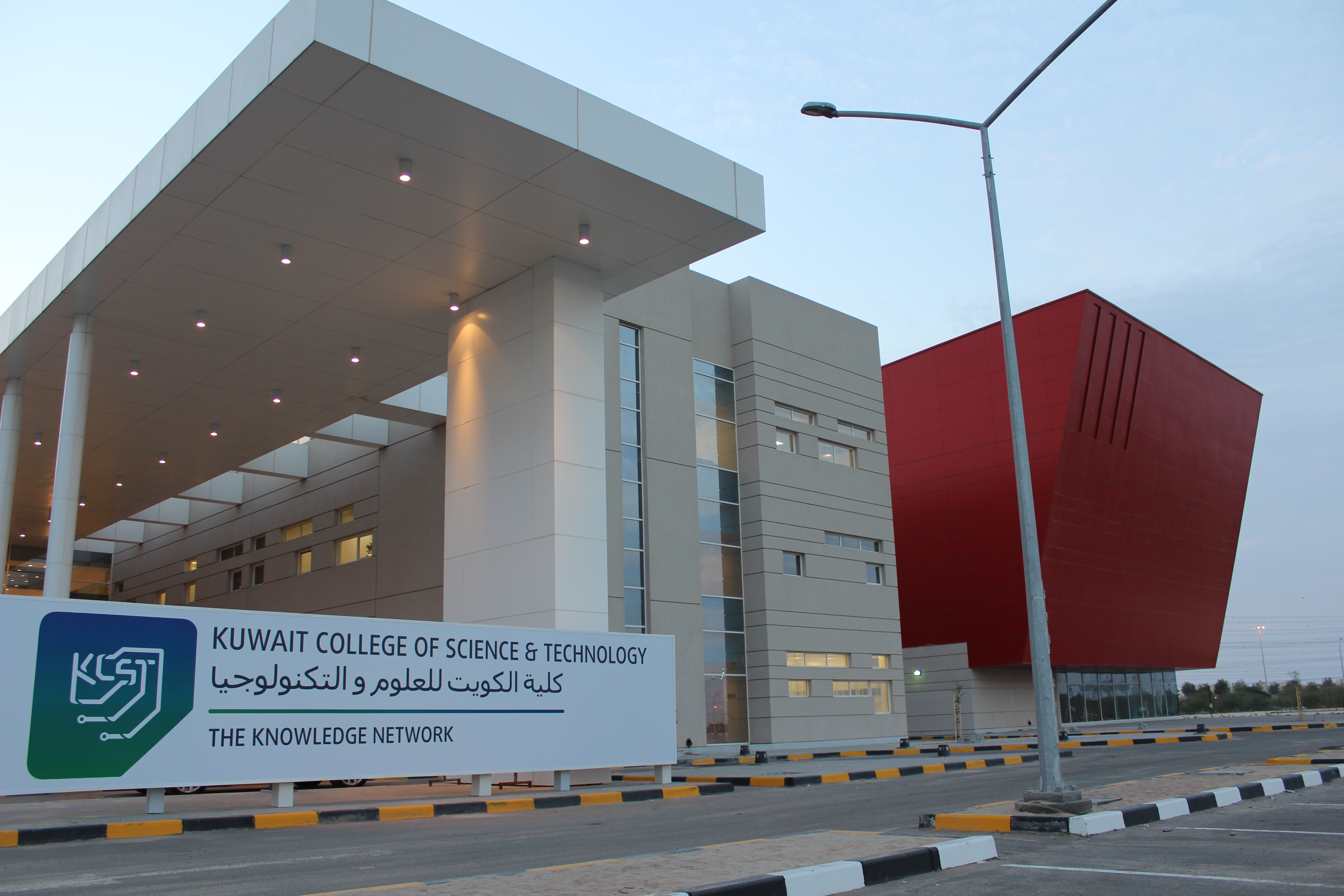
Main entrance

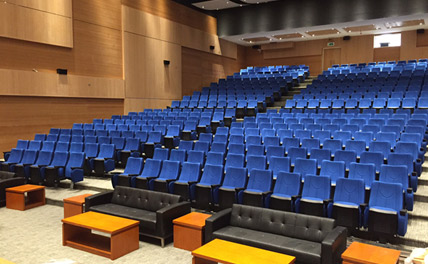
Auditorium

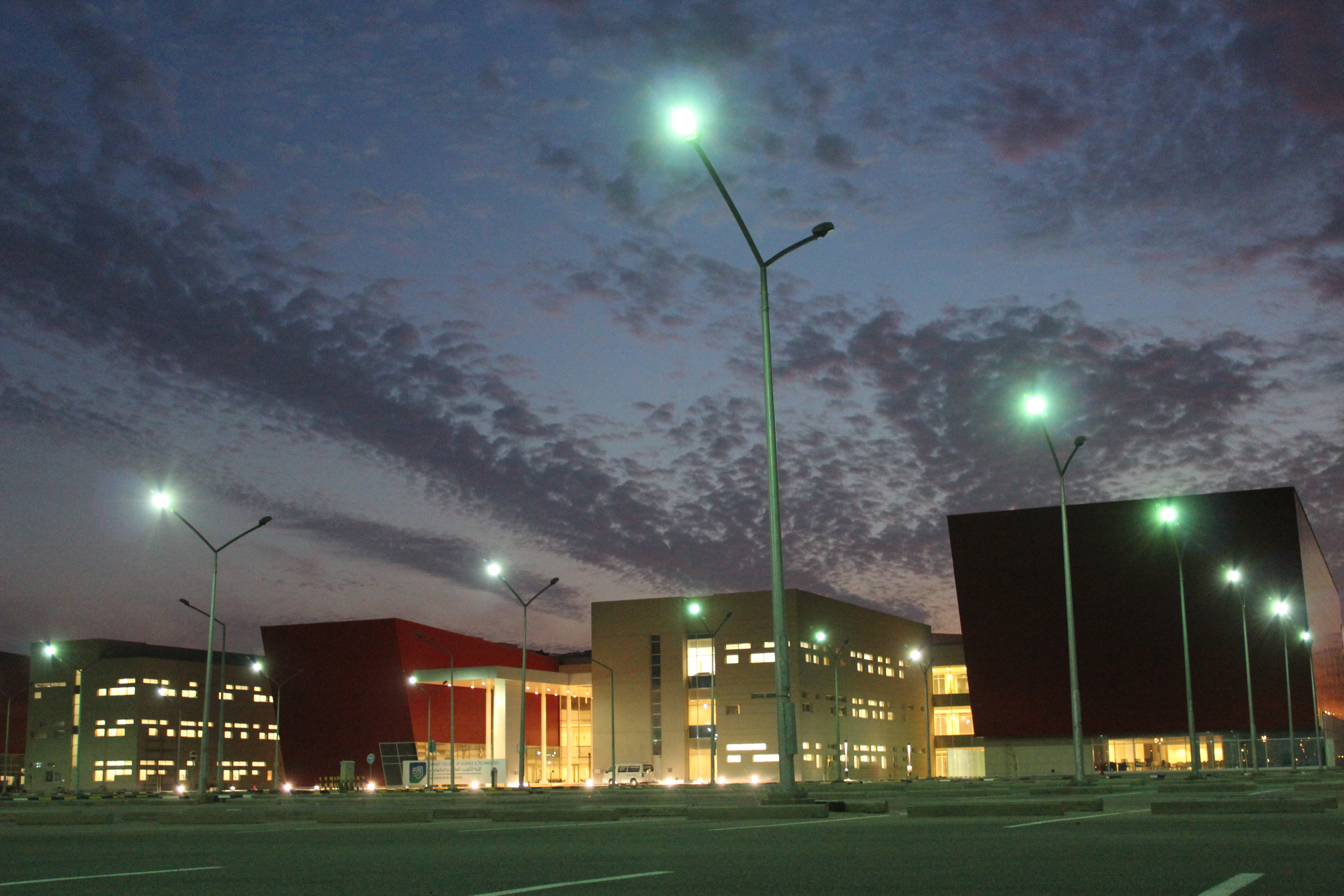
Evening

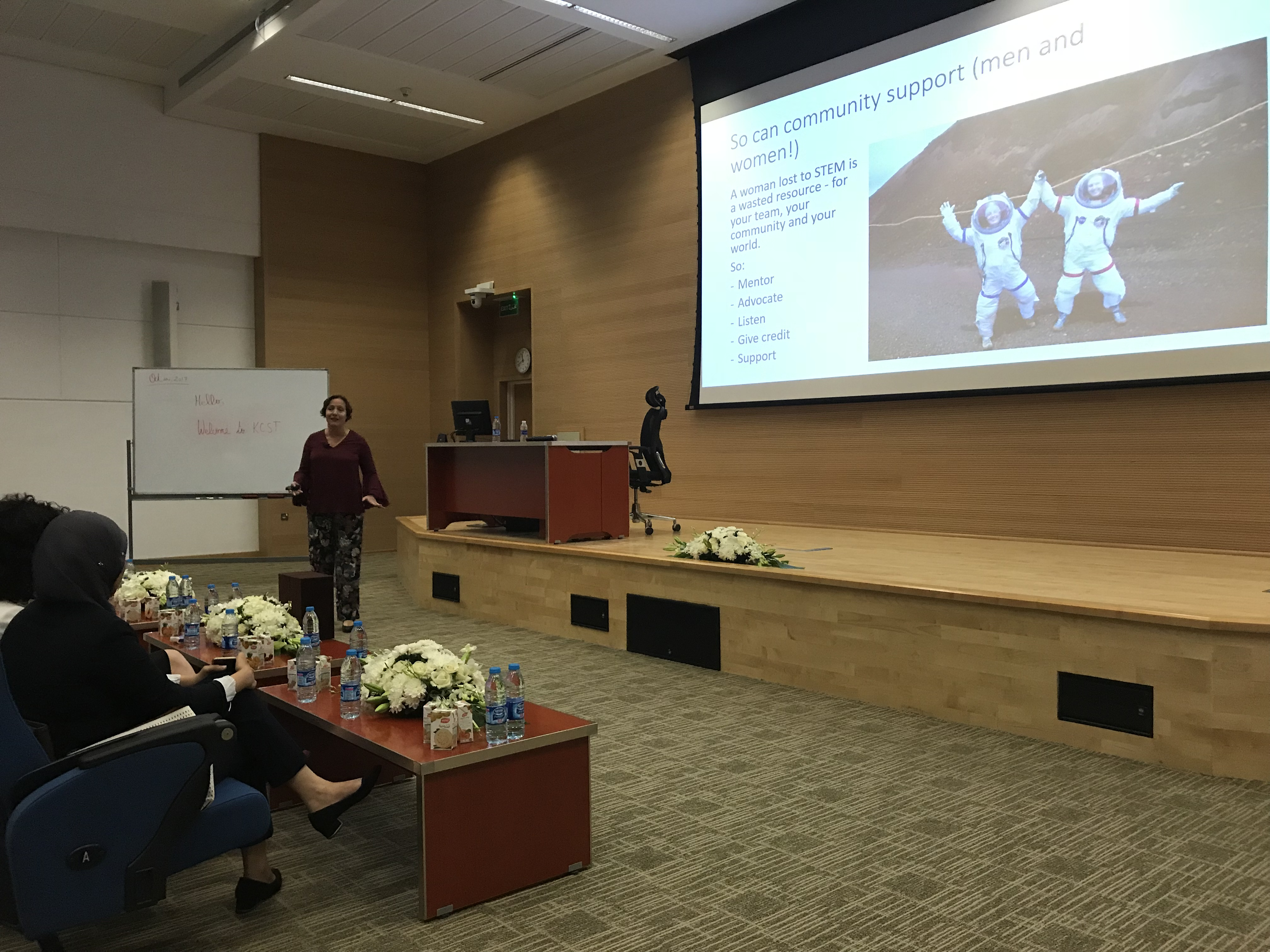
Kim Binsted from the University of Hawaii delivering an invited talk on HI-SEAS Project (funded by NASA) at KCST in October 2017

== See also ==
- List of universities in Kuwait
