= Australian University (Kuwait) =

Private University in Kuwait

Coordinates: 29°16′31″N 48°3′3″E

- الجامعة الاسترالية
- Type: Private
- Established: 2004
- Location: Mubarak Al-Abdallah Area, Mubarak Al-Kabeer, Kuwait
- Colours: Orange and blue
- Mascot: KINGaroo
- Website: www.au.edu.kw

The Australian University (AU) (Arabic: الجامعة الأسترالية) is a private university in Kuwait, located in Mubarak Al-Abdullah Al-Jaber (West Mishref). It offers diploma and bachelor's degree programs in engineering, business, aviation, and maritime studies, and operates under the oversight of Kuwait's Private Universities Council.

== History ==
The university originated as the Australian College of Kuwait (ACK), founded in 2004 as one of Kuwait's early private higher-education institutions. ACK initially offered diploma-level programs and later added bachelor's degrees in engineering, business, and aviation.

In 2019, following regulatory approval, the institution was renamed Australian University (AU). It continues to operate under Kuwait's private higher education framework.

== Academic Structure ==
AU is organized into a College of Engineering, a College of Business, a School of Aviation, and a Maritime Department. Each offers diploma-level programs alongside bachelor's degrees, with a "2+2" pathway allowing students to progress from a diploma into a related bachelor's program. Engineering programs cover fields such as civil, mechanical, electrical and electronics, and petroleum engineering; business programs include management, marketing, accounting, and finance; aviation programs include aircraft maintenance engineering and aviation and airport operations; the Maritime Department offers an advanced diploma in nautical science.

== Campus ==
AU's main campus in West Mishref includes engineering and computing laboratories, aviation maintenance facilities, maritime simulation and navigation centers, and standard academic and student facilities such as a library and study spaces.
