= Mike Young (Royal Navy officer) =

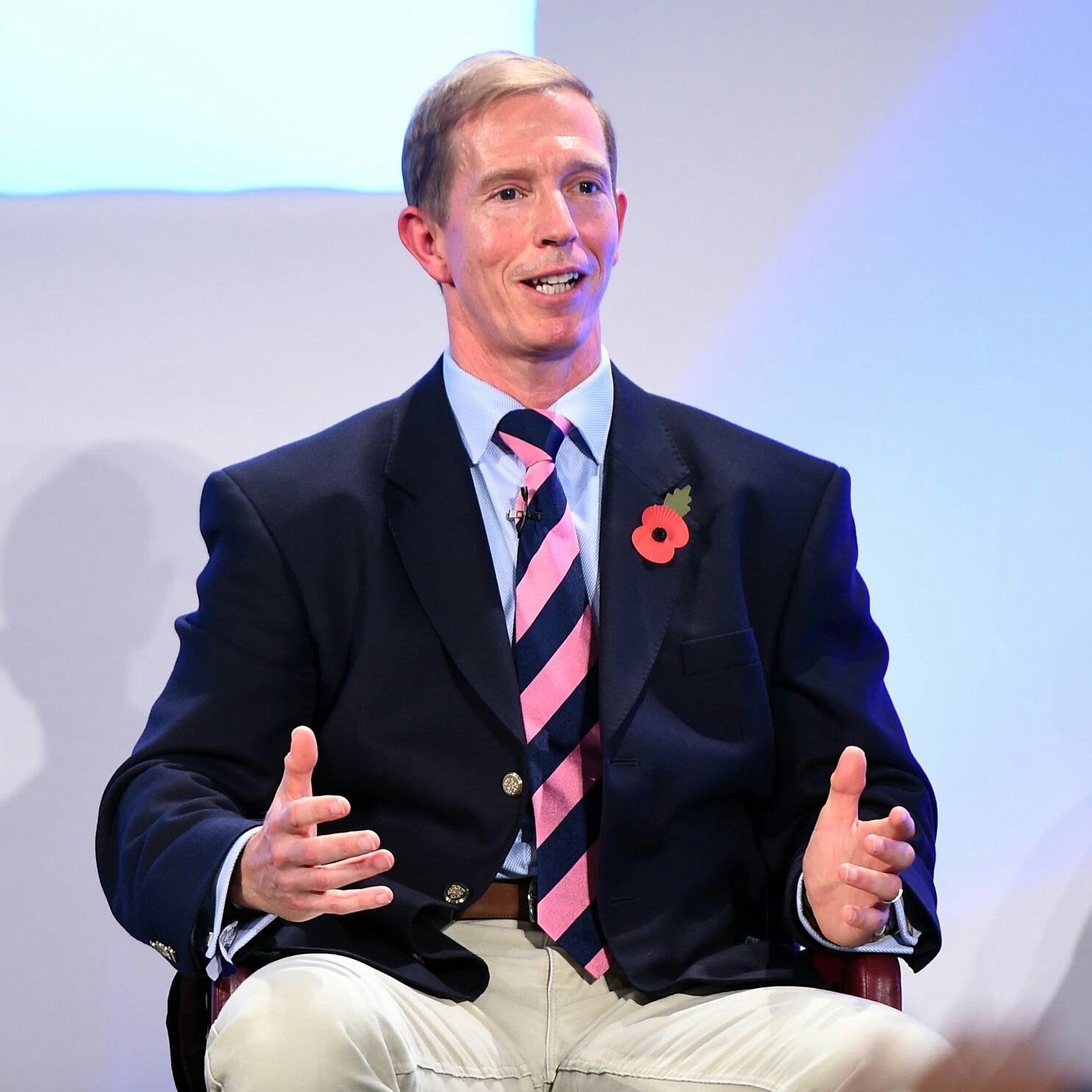
- Born: 19 April 1967 (age 59)
- Military career
- Allegiance: United Kingdom
- Branch: Royal Navy
- Service years: 33 years
- Rank: Captain
- Commands: Naval Careers Service, Naval Welfare Service, Physical Training Branch
- Awards: Member of the British Empire
- Website: http://www.consultmike.com/

Mike Young MBE (born 19 April 1967) is a leadership consultant and academic specialising in the fields of leadership, change and systems thinking.

== Early life and education ==
Young was born in April 1967 in Londonderry, Northern Ireland. He studied Environmental Science at the University of Ulster has completed two master's degrees with dissertations in leadership and a Doctor in Business Administration. He was also the 2019/2020 Hudson Fellow at St Antony's College Oxford. A Chartered Fellow of the Chartered Institute of Personnel and Development, and a Fellow of the Institute of Business Consulting, he is also a certified management consultant, coach and supervisor.

== Career ==
Young joined the Royal Navy in 1989 and spent six years (1991-1995 and 1999-2001) on attachment to the Royal Marines. As a retired Royal Navy Captain Young continues to provide leadership assessment and development expertise to the Senior Service in a part-time capacity. Previously posts included being Head of Recruiting and prior to that Head of Physical Development devising the ‘NavyFit’ programme which increased participation in physical activity, morale and retention. Previously, as Dean of the Navy's engineering college, Young introduced an output-focussed strategy management system, and a coaching culture, which underpinned the first ever military OFSTED ‘Outstanding’ award achieved in the UK. He also spent four years (2001-2005) as the Royal Navy's Head of Leadership and Management Development, developing the model on which the Navy's leadership selection and training is based.

Young is also Director of the boutique consultancy Human Systems Leadership and a research active academic and author of numerous journal articles.

== Awards ==
Young was awarded an MBE in the Queen's Birthday Honours List 2005, in recognition for his contribution to leadership development in the Royal Navy.
