= List of Sigma Tau Delta chapters =

Sigma Tau Delta is an international honor society for students of English at four-year colleges and universities. It was founded on December 12, 1922 as the English Club of Dakota Wesleyan University in Mitchell, South Dakota, adopting its current name in May 1, 1924.

== Chapters ==
Following are the chapters of Sigma Tau Delta, with active chapters indicated in bold and inactive chapters and institutions are in italics.

Chapter	Charter date and range	Institution	Location	Status	Ref.
**Alpha**	December 12, 1922 – 1930; 1961	Dakota Wesleyan University	Mitchell, South Dakota	Active	
Phi	1925 - xxxx ; 2008	Minot State University	Minot, North Dakota	Inactive	
**Alpha Alpha**	2008	Notre Dame of Maryland University	Baltimore, Maryland	Active	
Beta Alpha	1924–1929	Grand Island College	Grand Island, Nebraska	Inactive	
Gamma Alpha	1924–1929	Lombard College	Galesburg, Illinois	Inactive	(Note: The college closed in 1930.)
Delta Alpha	1924	Westmar College	Le Mars, Iowa	Inactive	(Note: The chapter formed at Western Union College, which became Westmar College in 1948. Later called Westmar University, it permanently closed in 1997.)
Epsilon Alpha	1925–1930	Parsons College	Fairfield, Iowa	Inactive	
Zeta Alpha	1925–1931	Kansas Wesleyan University	Salina, Kansas	Inactive	
**Eta Alpha**	1925–1932, 1938–1942, 1946–1950	Georgetown College	Georgetown, Kentucky	Active	
Theta Alpha	1925–1940	College of Idaho	Caldwell, Idaho	Inactive	
Iota Alpha	1925–1936	Jamestown College	Jamestown, North Dakota	Inactive	
**Kappa Alpha**	1925	Simpson College	Indianola, Iowa	Active	
**Lambda Alpha**	1925	Baylor University	Waco, Texas	Active	
Mu Alpha	1925	The Grand Chapter		Inactive	
**Nu Alpha**	1925–1946	Drake University	Des Moines, Iowa	Active	
Xi Alpha	1925–1929	University of Chattanooga	Chattanooga, Tennessee	Inactive	
Omicron Alpha	April 4, 1925 – 1931; 1944	Iowa Wesleyan College	Mount Pleasant, Iowa	Inactive	
**Pi Alpha**	June 1925 – 1934	Drury University	Springfield, Missouri	Active	
**Rho Alpha**	1926	Monmouth College	Monmouth, Illinois	Active	
**Sigma Alpha**	1926	Pittsburg State University	Pittsburg, Kansas	Active	
Tau Alpha	1926	Upper Iowa University	Fayette, Iowa	Inactive	
**Upsilon Alpha**	1926	University of Redlands	Redlands, California	Active	
Phi Alpha	1926	Peru State College	Peru, Nebraska	Inactive	
**Chi Alpha**	1926–1956	Texas Christian University	Fort Worth, Texas	Active	
Psi Alpha	1926–1927	State College of Washington	Pullman, Washington	Inactive	
**Omega Alpha**	1926	Muskingum University	New Concord, Ohio	Active	
**Alpha Beta**	1927–1940	Southwestern University	Georgetown, Texas	Active	
**Beta Beta**	1927	Case Western Reserve University	Cleveland, Ohio	Active	
**Gamma Beta**	January 1927 – xxxx ?; 2008	Morningside University	Sioux City, Iowa	Active	
**Delta Beta**	1927	University of Mary Hardin–Baylor	Belton, Texas	Active	
Epsilon Beta	1927	Bucknell University	Lewisburg, Pennsylvania	Inactive	
Zeta Beta	1927–1938	Hillsdale College	Hillsdale, Michigan	Inactive	
**Eta Beta**	1927	Saint Mary-of-the-Woods College	Saint Mary-of-the-Woods, Indiana	Active	
**Theta Beta**	1928	Hunter College	New York City, New York	Active	
**Iota Beta**	1928–1956	Columbia College	Columbia, South Carolina	Active	
**Kappa Beta**	1928–1944	Lindenwood University	St. Charles, Missouri	Active	
Lambda Beta	1928–1944, 1951	Iowa State Teachers College	Cedar Falls, Iowa	Inactive	
**Mu Beta**	1928–1930, 1951–1960	William Jewell College	Liberty, Missouri	Active	
**Nu Beta**	1928–1946	University of Lynchburg	Lynchburg, Virginia	Active	
**Xi Beta**	1928	University of Nebraska at Kearney	Kearney, Nebraska	Active	
Omicron Beta	1928–1930	Duke University	Durham, North Carolina	Inactive	
**Pi Beta**	January 18, 1929	Wayne State College	Wayne, Nebraska	Active	
**Rho Beta**	1929–1959	Albright College	Reading, Pennsylvania	Active	
**Sigma Beta**	1929–1945, 1961–1963	Chadron State College	Chadron, Nebraska	Active	
**Tau Beta**	1929	Southeastern Oklahoma State University	Durant, Oklahoma	Active	
Upsilon Beta	1929	East Texas A&M University	Commerce, Texas	Inactive	
Phi Beta	1929	Harris–Stowe State University	St. Louis, Missouri	Inactive	(Note: Chapter formed at Harris Teachers College, now Harris–Stowe State University.)
Chi Beta	1930–c. 1957	Shurtleff College	Alton, Illinois	Inactive	(Note: The private college became part of Southern Illinois University in June 1957.)
**Psi Beta**	April 2, 1930	University of Wisconsin–Stevens Point	Stevens Point, Wisconsin	Active	
**Omega Beta**	1930–1931, 1954	Ouachita Baptist University	Arkadelphia, Arkansas	Active	
Alpha Gamma	1930–1932	Eastern State Teachers College	Madison, South Dakota	Inactive	
Beta Gamma				Unassigned	
Gamma Gamma				Unassigned	
**Delta Gamma**	1930–1945	California State University, Fresno	Fresno, California	Active	
**Epsilon Gamma**	1930–1950	Northwest Missouri State University	Maryville, Missouri	Active	
Zeta Gamma	1930	Western New Mexico University	Silver City, New Mexico	Inactive	
**Eta Gamma**	1930–1940	Lake Forest College	Lake Forest, Illinois	Active	
Theta Gamma	1930–1936	New Mexico Normal School	Las Vegas, New Mexico	Inactive	
Iota Gamma	1930–1932	Doane College	Crete, Nebraska	Inactive	
**Kappa Gamma**	1931–1950, 1964	University of Nebraska Omaha	Omaha, Nebraska	Active	
Lambda Gamma	1931	Carroll College	Waukesha, Wisconsin	Inactive	
Mu Gamma	March 7, 1931	Moorhead State College	Moorhead, Minnesota	Inactive	
Nu Gamma	1931–1944	Whitewater Teachers College	Whitewater, Wisconsin	Inactive	
**Xi Gamma**	1931	Northern State University	Aberdeen, South Dakota	Active	
**Omicron Gamma**	1931–1933, xxxx ?	North Dakota State University	Fargo, North Dakota	Active	
**Pi Gamma**	1931	Coker University	Hartsville, South Carolina	Active	
**Rho Gamma**	1931	Louisiana Tech University	Ruston, Louisiana	Active	
**Sigma Gamma**	1932–1956, xxxx ?	North Central College	Naperville, Illinois	Active	
**Tau Gamma**	1932–1940, xxxx ?	Arizona State University	Tempe, Arizona	Active	
**Upsilon Gamma**	1932	Eastern Illinois University	Charleston, Illinois	Active	
Phi Gamma				Unassigned	
**Chi Gamma**	1933–1940, 1950	University of Central Oklahoma	Edmond, Oklahoma	Active	
Psi Gamma	1933–1950	Youngstown College	Youngstown, Ohio	Inactive	
Omega Gamma				Unassigned	
Alpha Delta	1934	Southeast Missouri State University	Cape Girardeau, Missouri	Inactive	
**Beta Delta**	1934	Marquette University	Milwaukee, Wisconsin	Active	
**Gamma Delta**	February 1935 – 1937; 1956	Trinity University	San Antonio, Texas	Active	(Note: Chapter formed at Westmoorland College, which merged with Trinity College in 1942.)
**Delta Delta**	1935–1942	Sam Houston State University	Huntsville, Texas	Active	
Epsilon Delta	May 17, 1935 – 1947	Wilson Teachers College	Washington, D.C.	Inactive	
**Zeta Delta**	1935	Butler University	Indianapolis, Indiana	Active	
**Eta Delta**	1935	Slippery Rock University	Slippery Rock, Pennsylvania	Active	
**Theta Delta**	February 2, 1936	University of North Alabama	Florence, Alabama	Active	
**Iota Delta**	1936	McKendree University	Lebanon, Illinois	Active	
Kappa Delta	1936	Bowling Green State University	Bowling Green, Ohio	Inactive	
**Lambda Delta**	1936	Illinois State University	Normal, Illinois	Active	
Mu Delta	1937	Our Lady of the Lake University	San Antonio, Texas	Inactive	
Nu Delta	1937	Buena Vista College	Storm Lake, Iowa	Inactive	
**Xi Delta**	1938	Northern Illinois University	DeKalb, Illinois	Active	
Omicron Delta	1938	Ball State University	Muncie, Indiana	Inactive	
**Pi Delta**	1939	Duquesne University	Pittsburgh, Pennsylvania	Active	
**Rho Delta**	1939–1942, xxxx ?	Southern Illinois University Carbondale	Carbondale, Illinois	Active	
**Sigma Delta**	1940	Central Michigan University	Mount Pleasant, Michigan	Active	
**Tau Delta**	1940	University of North Texas	Denton, Texas	Active	
**Upsilon Delta**	1941	Waynesburg University	Waynesburg, Pennsylvania	Active	
**Phi Delta**	1941	Western Illinois University	Macomb, Illinois	Active	
**Chi Delta**	1941	Oklahoma Baptist University	Shawnee, Oklahoma	Active	
**Psi Delta**	1943	Texas Tech University	Lubbock, Texas	Active	
**Omega Delta**	1944	Marywood University	Scranton, Pennsylvania	Active	
**Alpha Epsilon**	1945	University of Mary Washington	Fredericksburg, Virginia	Active	
**Beta Epsilon**	1945	Texas Woman's University	Denton, Texas	Active	
**Gamma Epsilon**	1946	Oklahoma State University	Stillwater, Oklahoma	Active	
Delta Epsilon	1947	Central College	Pella, Iowa	Inactive	
Epsilon Epsilon				Unassigned	
Zeta Epsilon	1947	Briar Cliff College	Sioux City, Iowa	Inactive	
Eta Epsilon	1947–1952	Dickinson State Teachers College	Dickinson, North Dakota	Inactive	
Theta Epsilon				Unassigned ?	
**Iota Epsilon**	1947	Anderson University	Anderson, Indiana	Active	
**Kappa Epsilon**	1947	Centenary College of Louisiana	Shreveport, Louisiana	Active	
Lambda Epsilon	1947	Davis & Elkins College	Elkins, West Virginia	Inactive	
**Mu Epsilon**	1948–1952, xxxx ?	University of Florida	Gainesville, Florida	Active	
**Nu Epsilon**	1948	Missouri Valley College	Marshall, Missouri	Active	
Xi Epsilon	1949	Hardin–Simmons University	Abilene, Texas	Inactive	
**Omicron Epsilon**	1949	Mississippi University for Women	Columbus, Mississippi	Active	
**Pi Epsilon**	1949	Jacksonville State University	Jacksonville, Alabama	Active	
**Rho Epsilon**	1950	Florida State University	Tallahassee, Florida	Active	
**Sigma Epsilon**	1950	Eastern Kentucky University	Richmond, Kentucky	Active	
**Tau Epsilon**	1950	Abilene Christian University	Abilene, Texas	Active	
Upsilon Epsilon	1950–1959	Seattle Pacific University	Seattle, Washington	Inactive	
**Phi Epsilon**	1951	McMurry University	Abilene, Texas	Active	
Chi Epsilon	February 1951	Hardin–Simmons University	Abilene, Texas	Inactive	
**Chi Epsilon**	1951	Mount Mary University	Milwaukee, Wisconsin	Active	
**Psi Epsilon**	1951	Florida Southern College	Lakeland, Florida	Active	
**Omega Epsilon**	1952	Texas State University	San Marcos, Texas	Active	
**Alpha Zeta**	1954	Sul Ross State University	Alpine, Texas	Active	
**Beta Zeta**	1955	University of Louisiana at Monroe	Monroe, Louisiana	Active	
**Gamma Zeta**	1955	Stetson University	DeLand, Florida	Active	
**Delta Zeta**	1955	East Stroudsburg University	East Stroudsburg, Pennsylvania	Active	
**Epsilon Zeta**	1956	Carthage College	Kenosha, Wisconsin	Active	
Zeta Zeta				Inactive	
Eta Zeta				Inactive	
Theta Zeta	1956	University of Wisconsin–Eau Claire	Eau Claire, Wisconsin	Inactive	
Iota Zeta				Inactive	
**Kappa Zeta**	1956	Athens State University	Athens, Alabama	Active	
**Lambda Zeta**	March 20, 1956	University of Louisiana at Lafayette	Lafayette, Louisiana	Active	
**Mu Zeta**	1956	Lipscomb University	Nashville, Tennessee	Active	
**Nu Zeta**	1956	Texas Wesleyan University	Fort Worth, Texas	Active	
Xi Zeta	1956	Pennsylvania State University	State College, Pennsylvania	Inactive	
Omicron Zeta	1956	Long Island University	Brooklyn, New York	Inactive	
**Pi Zeta**	1956	McNeese State University	Lake Charles, Louisiana	Active	
**Rho Zeta**	1956	University of Tampa	Tampa, Florida	Active	
Sigma Zeta				Inactive	
**Tau Zeta**	1957	Tennessee Technological University	Cookeville, Tennessee	Active	
Upsilon Zeta	1957	Greenville College	Greenville, Illinois	Inactive	
Phi Zeta	1957	Pontifical Catholic University of Puerto Rico	Ponce, Puerto Rico	Inactive	
**Chi Zeta**	1957	Caldwell University	Caldwell, New Jersey	Active	
**Psi Zeta**	1957	Mississippi College	Clinton, Mississippi	Active	
Omega Zeta	1957	Louisiana State University	Baton Rouge, Louisiana	Inactive	
**Alpha Theta**	1957	Nicholls State University	Thibodaux, Louisiana	Active	
Beta Theta	1957	C.W. Post Campus of Long Island University	Brookville, New York	Inactive	
**Gamma Theta**	1958	University of Central Missouri	Warrensburg, Missouri	Active	
Delta Theta	1958	California University of Pennsylvania	California, Pennsylvania	Inactive	
**Epsilon Theta**	1959	Southern Arkansas University	Magnolia, Arkansas	Active	
**Zeta Theta**	1959	Samford University	Birmingham, Alabama	Active	
**Eta Theta**	1959	Wayland Baptist University	Plainview, Texas	Active	
**Theta Theta**	1959	Howard University	Washington, D.C.	Active	
Iota Theta	1960	Bethany College		Inactive	
**Kappa Theta**	1960	Auburn University	Auburn, Alabama	Active	
**Lambda Theta**	1960	University of Wisconsin–Milwaukee	Milwaukee, Wisconsin	Active	
**Mu Theta**	1960	University of Texas at Arlington	Arlington, Texas	Active	
**Nu Theta**	1961	University of Missouri–Kansas City	Kansas City, Missouri	Active	
**Xi Theta**	1961	University of Findlay	Findlay, Ohio	Active	
Omicron Theta	1961	East Carolina University	Greenville, North Carolina	Inactive	
**Pi Theta**	1961	Colorado State University	Fort Collins, Colorado	Active	
**Rho Theta**	1961	Southern Methodist University	Dallas, Texas	Active	
Sigma Theta	1961	Sterling College	Sterling, Kansas	Inactive	
**Tau Theta**	1962	Olivet Nazarene University	Bourbonnais, Illinois	Active	
Upsilon Theta	1962	College of Saint Mary	Omaha, Nebraska	Inactive	
**Phi Theta**	1962	Texas Lutheran University	Seguin, Texas	Active	
**Chi Theta**	1962	West Texas A&M University	Canyon, Texas	Active	
Psi Theta				Inactive	
**Omega Theta**	1962	University of Tennessee at Martin	Martin, Tennessee	Active	
Alpha Iota	1963 – 19xx ?; 20xx ?–20xx ?	Texas A&M University	College Station, Texas	Inactive	
**Beta Iota**	1963	Marshall University	Huntington, West Virginia	Active	
**Gamma Iota**	1963	Muhlenberg College	Allentown, Pennsylvania	Active	
**Delta Iota**	1963	Ohio Northern University	Ada, Ohio	Active	
**Epsilon Iota**	1963	Culver–Stockton College	Canton, Missouri	Active	
Zeta Iota				Inactive	
Eta Iota				Inactive	
Theta Iota	1963	Keuka College	Keuka Park, New York	Inactive	
Iota Iota				Inactive	
Kappa Iota				Inactive	
Lambda Iota				Inactive	
**Mu Iota**	1964	Northeastern State University	Tahlequah, Oklahoma	Active	
**Nu Iota**	1964	Northwestern State University	Natchitoches, Louisiana	Active	
**Xi Iota**	1964	Carson–Newman University	Jefferson City, Tennessee	Active	
**Omicron Iota**	1964	Franciscan University of Steubenville	Steubenville, Ohio	Active	
**Pi Iota**	1964	Western Kentucky University	Bowling Green, Kentucky	Active	
**Rho Iota**	1964	PennWest Clarion	Clarion, Pennsylvania	Active	
Sigma Iota				Inactive	
Tau Iota				Inactive	
Upsilon Iota				Inactive	
**Phi Iota**	1965	Stephen F. Austin State University	Nacogdoches, Texas	Active	
**Chi Iota**	1964	Minnesota State University, Mankato	Mankato, Minnesota	Active	
Psi Iota				Inactive	
Omega Iota	1964	Georgia State University	Atlanta, Georgia	Inactive	
Alpha Kappa	1964	Cardinal Stritch University	Milwaukee, Wisconsin	Inactive	
Beta Kappa				Inactive	
Gamma Kappa				Inactive	
**Delta Kappa**	1965	Indiana State University	Terre Haute, Indiana	Active	
**Epsilon Kappa**	1965	Berry College	Mount Berry, Georgia	Active	
Zeta Kappa				Inactive	
Eta Kappa	1966	Radford University	Radford, Virginia	Inactive	
**Theta Kappa**	1966	Commonwealth University-Bloomsburg	Bloomsburg, Pennsylvania	Active	
Iota Kappa	1966	University of Charleston	Charleston, West Virginia	Inactive	
**Kappa Kappa**	1966	University of Richmond	Richmond, Virginia	Active	
**Lambda Kappa**	1967	University of Montevallo	Montevallo, Alabama	Active	
Mu Kappa				Inactive	
Nu Kappa				Inactive	
**Xi Kappa**	1966	Cedar Crest College	Allentown, Pennsylvania	Active	
**Xi Kappa**	1967	Mississippi State University	Mississippi State, Mississippi	Active	
Omicron Kappa				Inactive	
Pi Kappa				Inactive	
Rho Kappa				Inactive	
Sigma Kappa				Inactive	
**Tau Kappa**	1966	Marian University	Fond du Lac, Wisconsin	Active	
Upsilon Kappa	1966	Campbellsville University	Campbellsville, Kentucky	Inactive	
**Phi Kappa**	1966	West Virginia Wesleyan College	Buckhannon, West Virginia	Active	
Chi Kappa				Inactive	
Psi Kappa				Inactive	
Omega Kappa				Inactive	
**Alpha Lambda**	1970	Truman State University	Kirksville, Missouri	Active	
**Beta Lambda**	1970	Bradley University	Peoria, Illinois	Active	
**Gamma Lambda**	1970	Gardner–Webb University	Boiling Springs, North Carolina	Active	
**Delta Lambda**	1971	Houston Christian University	Houston, Texas	Active	
**Epsilon Lambda**	1971	Frostburg State University	Frostburg, Maryland	Active	
Zeta Lambda				Inactive	
**Eta Lambda**	1971	Lyon College	Batesville, Arkansas	Active	
Theta Lambda	1971	Eureka College	Eureka, Illinois	Inactive	
**Iota Lambda**	1971	State University of New York at Geneseo	Geneseo, New York	Active	
Kappa Lambda	1971	Savannah State University	Savannah, Georgia	Inactive	
**Lambda Lambda**	1971	Saint Augustine's University	Raleigh, North Carolina	Active	
**Mu Lambda**	1971	Central Methodist University	Fayette, Missouri	Active	
Nu Lambda	1972	United States Naval Academy	Annapolis, Maryland	Inactive	
**Xi Lambda**	1972	Johnson C. Smith University	Charlotte, North Carolina	Active	
**Omicron Lambda**	1972	Fayetteville State University	Fayetteville, North Carolina	Active	
**Pi Lambda**	1972	Troy University	Troy, Alabama	Active	
**Rho Lambda**	1972	Lewis University	Romeoville, Illinois	Active	
Sigma Lambda	1972	Lane College	Jackson, Tennessee	Inactive	
**Tau Lambda**	1972	Mississippi Valley State University	Itta Bena, Mississippi	Active	
**Upsilon Lambda**	1972	Prairie View A&M University	Prairie View, Texas	Active	
**Phi Lambda**	1972	Coppin State University	Baltimore, Maryland	Active	
**Chi Lambda**	1972	Elmhurst University	Elmhurst, Illinois	Active	
**Psi Lambda**	1972	Evangel University	Springfield, Missouri	Active	
**Omega Lambda**	1972	University of Virginia's College at Wise	Wise, Virginia	Active	
**Alpha Mu**	1972	Heidelberg University	Tiffin, Ohio	Active	
**Beta Mu**	1972	East Texas Baptist University	Marshall, Texas	Active	
Gamma Mu	1972	Southampton		Inactive	
Delta Mu	1972	Wagner College	Staten Island, New York	Inactive	
**Epsilon Mu**	1972	Tarkio College	Tarkio, Missouri	Active	
Zeta Mu	1972	Kentucky State University	Frankfort, Kentucky	Inactive	
Eta Mu	1972	William Woods University	Fulton, Missouri	Inactive	
**Theta Mu**	May 1973 – 19xx ?; 20xx ?	Winston-Salem State University	Winston-Salem, North Carolina	Active	
**Iota Mu**	1973	Winthrop University	Rock Hill, South Carolina	Active	
Kappa Mu	1973	Union College	Barbourville, Kentucky	Inactive	
**Lambda Mu**	1973	University of Wisconsin–Oshkosh	Oshkosh, Wisconsin	Active	
Mu Mu	1973	Alverno College	Milwaukee, Wisconsin	Inactive	
Nu Mu	1973	Ozarks		Inactive	
**Xi Mu**	1973	Kent State University	Kent, Ohio	Active	
**Omicron Mu**	1974 – xxxx?; 2008	Henderson State University	Arkadelphia, Arkansas	Active	
**Pi Mu**	1974	Harding University	Searcy, Arkansas	Active	
**Rho Mu**	1974	Oklahoma Christian University	Oklahoma City, Oklahoma	Active	
**Sigma Mu**	1974	Georgian Court University	Lakewood Township, New Jersey	Active	
Tau Mu	1974	Missouri Western State University	St. Joseph, Missouri	Inactive	
Upsilon Mu	1974	University of Alabama in Huntsville	Huntsville, Alabama	Inactive	
**Phi Mu**	1974	University of Miami	Coral Gables, Florida	Active	
Chi Mu	1974	Salem College		Inactive	
Psi Mu	1974	University of Maryland Eastern Shore	Princess Anne, Maryland	Inactive	
**Omega Mu**	1974	University of South Florida	Tampa, Florida	Active	
**Alpha Nu**	1974	Glenville State University	Glenville, West Virginia	Active	
**Beta Nu**	1974	Alabama A&M University	Normal, Alabama	Active	
**Gamma Nu**	1974	Lamar University	Beaumont, Texas	Active	
**Delta Nu**	1974	Missouri State University	Springfield, Missouri	Active	
**Epsilon Nu**	1975	Middle Tennessee State University	Murfreesboro, Tennessee	Active	
**Zeta Nu**	1975	University of Arkansas at Pine Bluff	Pine Bluff, Arkansas	Active	
**Eta Nu**	1975	University of Mississippi	University, Mississippi	Active	
**Theta Nu**	1975	Georgia Southwestern State University	Americus, Georgia	Active	
**Iota Nu**	1975	Elizabeth City State University	Elizabeth City, North Carolina	Active	
Kappa Nu	1975	University of Puget Sound	Tacoma, Washington	Inactive	
**Lambda Nu**	1975	Kutztown University	Kutztown, Pennsylvania	Active	
**Mu Nu**	1976	Midland University	Fremont, Nebraska	Active	
**Nu Nu**	1976	Bowie State University	Bowie, Maryland	Active	
**Xi Nu**	1976	Norfolk State University	Norfolk, Virginia	Active	
**Omicron Nu**	1977	West Liberty University	West Liberty, West Virginia	Active	
**Pi Nu**	1976	Angelo State University	San Angelo, Texas	Active	
Rho Nu	1976	Virginia Union University	Richmond, Virginia	Inactive	
**Sigma Nu**	1976	Benedict College	Columbia, South Carolina	Active	
**Tau Nu**	1976	Wofford College	Spartanburg, South Carolina	Active	
**Upsilon Nu**	1976	Morehouse College	Atlanta, Georgia	Active	
**Phi Nu**	1976	Miami University	Oxford, Ohio	Active	
Chi Nu	1976	Lehigh University	Bethlehem, Pennsylvania	Inactive	
**Psi Nu**	1977	Belmont University	Nashville, Tennessee	Active	
Omega Nu	1977	Bennett College	Greensboro, North Carolina	Inactive	
**Alpha Xi**	1977 – xxxx ?; 20xx ?	West Virginia University	Morgantown, West Virginia	Active	
**Beta Xi**	1977	Midwestern State University	Wichita Falls, Texas	Active	
**Gamma Xi**	1977	Alcorn State University	Lorman, Mississippi	Active	
**Delta Xi**	1977	West Chester University	West Chester, Pennsylvania	Active	
**Epsilon Xi**	1977	Louisiana Christian University	Pineville, Louisiana	Active	
**Zeta Xi**	1977– xxxx ?; 20xx ?	University of Central Florida	Orlando, Florida	Active	
**Eta Xi**	1977	South Carolina State University	Orangeburg, South Carolina	Active	
**Theta Xi**	1977	North Carolina A&T State University	Greensboro, North Carolina	Active	
**Iota Xi**	1977	Chaminade University of Honolulu	Honolulu, Hawaii	Active	
**Kappa Xi**	1977	Nebraska Wesleyan University	Lincoln, Nebraska	Active	
**Lambda Xi**	1978	Missouri Southern State University	Joplin, Missouri	Active	
**Mu Xi**	1978	Commonwealth University-Mansfield	Mansfield, Pennsylvania	Active	
**Nu Xi**	1978	University of Indianapolis	Indianapolis, Indiana	Active	
**Xi Xi**	1978	Indiana University of Pennsylvania	Indiana, Pennsylvania	Active	
Omicron Xi				Inactive	
Pi Xi	1978	University of Baltimore	Baltimore, Maryland	Inactive	
**Rho Xi**	1978	California State Polytechnic University, Pomona	Pomona, California	Active	
**Sigma XI**	1978	University of North Carolina at Pembroke	Pembroke, North Carolina	Active	
Tau Xi	1978	University of Texas at Austin	Austin, Texas	Inactive	
**Upsilon Xi**	1978	Kean University Union Campus	Union Township, New Jersey	Active	
**Phi Xi**	1979	University of Alabama	Tuscaloosa, Alabama	Active	
**Chi Xi**	1979	Syracuse University	Syracuse, New York	Active	
**Psi Xi**	1979	Southern Nazarene University	Bethany, Oklahoma	Active	
**Omega Xi**	1979	Spelman College	Atlanta, Georgia	Active	
**Alpha Omicron**	1979	Purdue University West Lafayette Campus	West Lafayette, Indiana	Active	
Beta Omicron	1979	Cameron University	Lawton, Oklahoma	Inactive	
**Gamma Omicron**	1979	Jarvis Christian University	Hawkins, Texas	Active	
**Delta Omicron**	1979	St. Francis College	Brooklyn Heights, New York City, New York	Active	
Epsilon Omicron				Inactive	
Zeta Omicron				Inactive	
**Eta Omicron**	1979	University of North Carolina at Asheville	Asheville, North Carolina	Active	
**Theta Omicron**	1979	Union University	Jackson, Tennessee	Active	
**Iota Omicron**	1980	Christopher Newport University	Newport News, Virginia	Active	
**Kappa Omicron**	1980	Jackson State University	Flowood, Mississippi	Active	
**Lambda Omicron**	1980	Southwestern Oklahoma State University	Weatherford, Oklahoma	Active	
**Mu Omicron**	1980	University of Scranton	Scranton, Pennsylvania	Active	
**Nu Omicron**	1980	Iona University	New Rochelle, New York	Active	
**Xi Omicron**	1980	Elon University	Elon, North Carolina	Active	
**Omicron Omicron**	1981	Lebanon Valley College	Annville Township, Pennsylvania	Active	
Pi Omicron	1981	University of West Georgia	Carrollton, Georgia	Inactive	
**Rho Omicron**	1983	Concordia University Nebraska	Seward, Nebraska	Active	
Sigma Omicron	1981	Paine College	Augusta, Georgia	Inactive	
**Tau Omicron**	198x ?–19xx ?; xxxx ?	Norwich University	Northfield, Vermont	Active	
**Upsilon Omicron**	1981	St. John's University	Queens, New York	Active	
Phi Omicron	1981	College of Mount St. Joseph	Cincinnati, Ohio	Inactive	
**Chi Omicron**	1981	University of West Alabama	Livingston, Alabama	Active	
**Psi Omicron**	1981	University of Memphis	Memphis, Tennessee	Active	
Omega Omicron				Inactive	
Alpha Pi				Inactive	
**Beta Pi**	1981	Manhattan University	Riverdale, Bronx, New York City, New York	Active	
**Gamma Pi**	1981	Hartwick College	Oneonta, New York	Active	
**Delta Pi**	1981	Mount Marty University	Yankton, South Dakota	Active	
**Epsilon Pi**	1981	Lenoir–Rhyne University	Hickory, North Carolina	Active	
**Zeta Pi**	1981	University of San Francisco	San Francisco, California	Active	
**Eta Pi**	1981	Kennesaw State University	Kennesaw, Georgia	Active	
Theta Pi	1981	Oregon State University	Corvallis, Oregon	Inactive	
**Iota Pi**	1981	California State University, Long Beach	Long Beach, California	Active	
Kappa Pi	1981	Alvernia University	Reading, Pennsylvania	Inactive	
Lambda Pi	1981	Millikin University	Decatur, Illinois	Inactive	
Mu Pi				Inactive	
**Nu Pi**	1981	Albion College	Albion, Michigan	Active	
Xi Pi				Inactive	
**Omicron Pi**	1981	Spring Hill College	Mobile, Alabama	Active	
**Pi Pi**	1981	University of South Alabama	Mobile, Alabama	Active	
**Rho Pi**	1981	The Citadel	Charleston, South Carolina	Active	
**Sigma Pi**	1981	Pace University	Pleasantville, New York	Active	
Tau Pi	1981	Pace University, New York Campus	New York City, New York	Inactive	
**Upsilon Pi**	1981	East Central University	Ada, Oklahoma	Active	
Phi Pi	1981	Touro College	Brooklyn, New York	Inactive	
**Chi Pi**	1982	Allen University	Columbia, South Carolina	Active	
**Psi Pi**		University of St. Francis	Joliet, Illinois	Active	
**Omega Pi**	1982	Lincoln University	Jefferson City, Missouri	Active	
**Alpha Rho**	1993	Virginia Tech	Blacksburg, Virginia	Active	
**Beta Rho**	1982	University of Toledo	Toledo, Ohio	Active	
Gamma Rho				Inactive	
**Delta Rho**	1982	Saint Elizabeth University	Morristown, New Jersey	Active	
**Epsilon Rho**	1982	University of Nevada, Las Vegas	Las Vegas, Nevada	Active	
**Zeta Rho**	1982	Roanoke College	Salem, Virginia	Active	
**Eta Rho**	1982	Stockton University	Galloway Township, New Jersey	Active	
**Theta Rho**	1982	St. Bonaventure University	St. Bonaventure, New York	Active	
Iota Rho	1982	Alabama State University	Montgomery, Alabama	Inactive	
**Kappa Rho**	2008	Florida Atlantic University	Boca Raton, Florida	Active	
**Lambda Rho**	1982	Commonwealth University-Lock Haven	Lock Haven, Pennsylvania	Active	
**Mu Rho**	1982	University of Delaware	Newark, Delaware	Active	
**Nu Rho**	1982	Francis Marion University	Florence, South Carolina	Active	
**Xi Rho**	1967	Southeastern Louisiana University	Hammond, Louisiana	Active	
**Omicron Rho**	1982	Drexel University	Philadelphia, Pennsylvania	Active	
**Pi Rho**	1982	Gustavus Adolphus College	St. Peter, Minnesota	Active	
Rho Rho	1982	Quincy University	Quincy, Illinois	Inactive	
**Sigma Rho**	1982	Georgia College & State University	Milledgeville, Georgia	Active	
**Tau Rho**	1982	State University of New York at Potsdam	Potsdam, New York	Active	
Upsilon Rho	1964	Oglethorpe University	Brookhaven, Georgia	Inactive	
**Phi Rho**	1982	Washburn University	Topeka, Kansas	Active	
**Chi Rho**	1982	Coastal Carolina University	Conway, South Carolina	Active	
**Psi Rho**	1982	Nazareth University	Rochester, New York	Active	
**Omega Rho**	1983	University of Northern Iowa	Cedar Falls, Iowa	Active	
**Alpha Sigma**	1983	North Carolina Central University	Durham, North Carolina	Active	
**Beta Sigma**	1983	University of North Carolina at Charlotte	Charlotte, North Carolina	Active	
Gamma Sigma	1983	University of Mobile	Mobile, Alabama	Inactive	
**Delta Sigma**	1983	Monmouth University	West Long Branch, New Jersey	Active	
**Epsilon Sigma**	1983	Baker University	Baldwin City, Kansas	Active	
**Zeta Sigma**	1983	Millsaps College	Jackson, Mississippi	Active	
**Eta Sigma**	1983	Ohio Wesleyan University	Delaware, Ohio	Active	
**Theta Sigma**	1983	Western Carolina University	Cullowhee, North Carolina	Active	
Iota Sigma	1983	Western Oregon University	Monmouth, Oregon	Inactive	
**Kappa Sigma**	1983	University of Wisconsin–River Falls	River Falls, Wisconsin	Active	
Lambda Sigma				Inactive	
Mu Sigma	1984	Montana State University Billings	Billings, Montana	Inactive	
**Nu Sigma**	1984	Andrews University	Berrien Springs, Michigan	Active	
**Xi Sigma**	1984	East Tennessee State University	Johnson City, Tennessee	Active	
Omicron Sigma	1984	Asbury University	Wilmore, Kentucky	Inactive	
**Pi Sigma**	1984	Benedictine College	Atchison, Kansas	Active	
Rho Sigma	1984	Washington Adventist University	Takoma Park, Maryland	Inactive	
Sigma Sigma	1984	Southwestern College	Winfield, Kansas	Inactive	
**Tau Sigma**	1984	Rhodes College	Memphis, Tennessee	Active	
**Upsilon Sigma**	1984	Whittier College	Whittier, California	Active	
**Phi Sigma**	1984	Georgia Southern University	Statesboro, Georgia	Active	
**Chi Sigma**	1984	Saint Louis University	St. Louis, Missouri	Active	
**Psi Sigma**	1985	James Madison University	Harrisonburg, Virginia	Active	
**Omega Sigma**	1985	Lycoming College	Williamsport, Pennsylvania	Active	
**Alpha Tau**	1985	St. Norbert College	De Pere, Wisconsin	Active	
**Beta Tau**	1985	SUNY Brockport	Brockport, New York	Active	
**Gamma Tau**	1985	Clemson University	Clemson, South Carolina	Active	
**Delta Tau**	1985	University of Alabama at Birmingham	Birmingham, Alabama	Active	
Epsilon Tau				Inactive	
**Zeta Tau**	1985	Liberty University	Lynchburg, Virginia	Active	
**Eta Tau**	1985	Huston–Tillotson University	Austin, Texas	Active	
Theta Tau				Inactive	
**Iota Tau**	1985	Grand Valley State University	Allendale, Michigan	Active	
**Kappa Tau**	1985	University of Utah	Salt Lake City, Utah	Active	
**Lambda Tau**	1985	Indiana Wesleyan University	Marion, Indiana	Active	
Mu Tau	1985–c. 2016	Dowling College	Oakdale, New York	Inactive	
**Nu Tau**	1985	Fairfield University	Fairfield, Connecticut	Active	(Note: The college closed in August 2016.)
**Xi Tau**	1985	California State University, Bakersfield	Bakersfield, California	Active	
**Omicron Tau**	1985	Arkansas Tech University	Russellville, Arkansas	Active	
**Pi Tau**	1985	State University of New York at New Paltz	New Paltz, New York	Active	
Rho Tau	1985	Utah State University	Logan, Utah	Inactive	
Sigma Tau				Inactive	
Tau Tau				Inactive	
**Upsilon Tau**	1985	Central State University	Wilberforce, Ohio	Active	
Phi Tau				Inactive	
**Chi Tau**	1985	University of Maryland, College Park	College Park, Maryland	Active	
**Psi Tau**	1985	Salem State University	Salem, Massachusetts	Active	
**Omega Tau**	1985	Carnegie Mellon University	Pittsburgh, Pennsylvania	Active	
**Alpha Upsilon**	1985	Messiah University	Mechanicsburg, Pennsylvania	Active	
**Beta Upsilon**	2008	Mercyhurst University	Erie, Pennsylvania	Active	
Gamma Upsilon	1985	American University of Paris	Paris, France	Inactive	
**Delta Upsilon**	1985	University of the Cumberlands	Williamsburg, Kentucky	Active	
**Epsilon Upsilon**	1985	University of South Carolina Aiken	Aiken, South Carolina	Active	
Zeta Upsilon				Inactive	
**Eta Upsilon**	1986	Suffolk University	Boston, Massachusetts	Active	
Theta Upsilon				Inactive	
**Iota Upsilon**	1986	Jacksonville University	Jacksonville, Florida	Active	
Kappa Upsilon	1967	Saint Martin's University	Lacey, Washington	Inactive	
**Lambda Upsilon**	1986	Louisiana State University Shreveport	Shreveport, Louisiana	Active	
Mu Upsilon				Inactive	
**Nu Upsion**	2008	Old Dominion University	Norfolk, Virginia	Active	
Xi Upsilon				Inactive	
Omicron Upsilon				Inactive	
**Pi Upsilon**		Morgan State University	Baltimore, Maryland	Active	
**Rho Upsilon**	1986	Loyola University Maryland	Baltimore, Maryland	Active	
Sigma Upsilon	1986	California Polytechnic State University, San Luis Obispo	San Luis Obispo, California	Inactive	
**Tau Upsilon**	1986	Mercer University	Macon, Georgia	Active	
**Upsilon Upsilon**	1986	University of Mount Union	Alliance, Ohio	Active	
**Phi Upsilon**	1986–xxxx ?, 20xx ?	Ursinus College	Collegeville, Pennsylvania	Active	
Chi Upsilon				Inactive	
Psi Upsilon				Inactive	
**Omega Upsilon**	1986	Loyola University New Orleans	New Orleans, Louisiana	Active	
Alpha Phi	1986	San Diego Christian College	Santee, California	Inactive	
Beta Phi	1986	College of Saint Rose	Albany, New York	Inactive	
**Gamma Phi**	1986	Texas A&M University–Kingsville	Kingsville, Texas	Active	
Delta Phi				Inactive	
**Epsilon Phi**	1986	University of Houston	Houston, Texas	Active	
Zeta Phi	1986	Albany State University	Albany, Georgia	Inactive	
**Eta Phi**	1986	Northern Michigan University	Marquette, Michigan	Active	
**Theta Phi**	1986	University at Albany	Albany, New York	Active	
**Iota Phi**	1986	Millersville University	Millersville, Pennsylvania	Active	
**Kappa Phi**	1986	Valparaiso University	Valparaiso, Indiana	Active	
**Lambda Phi**	1986	Eastern Oregon University	La Grande, Oregon	Active	
**Mu Phi**	1986	University of Southern Indiana	Evansville, Indiana	Active	
**Nu Phi**	1986	Rider University	Lawrenceville, New Jersey	Active	
**Xi Phi**	1986	Erskine College	Due West, South Carolina	Active	
**Omicron Phi**	1986	Saint Joseph's University	Philadelphia, Pennsylvania	Active	
Pi Phi				Inactive	
**Rho Phi**	1986	Illinois College	Jacksonville, Illinois	Active	
Sigma Phi				Inactive	
**Tau Phi**	1986	Colorado Mesa University	Grand Junction, Colorado	Active	
**Upsilon Phi**	2008	Keene State College	Keene, New Hampshire	Active	
**Phi Phi**	1987	Santa Clara University	Santa Clara, California	Active	
Chi Phi	1987	University of La Verne	La Verne, California	Inactive	
Psi Phi	1987	University of St. Thomas	Houston, Texas	Inactive	
**Omega Phi**	1987	Oklahoma City University	Oklahoma City, Oklahoma	Active	
Alpha Chi				Inactive	
**Beta Chi**	1987	Franklin College	Franklin, Indiana	Active	
**Gamma Chi**	1987	Campbell University	Buies Creek, North Carolina	Active	
**Delta Chi**	1987	Virginia Wesleyan University	Virginia Beach, Virginia	Active	
**Epsilon Chi**	1987	State University of New York at Cortland	Cortland, New York	Active	
**Zeta Chi**	1987	University of Notre Dame	Notre Dame, Indiana	Active	
Eta Chi	1987	University of Idaho	Moscow, Idaho	Inactive	
**Theta Chi**	1987	Susquehanna University	Selinsgrove, Pennsylvania	Active	
**Iota Chi**	1987	California State University, Northridge	Northridge, Los Angeles, California	Active	
Kappa Chi	March 1987	Tarleton State University	Stephenville, Texas	Inactive	
Lambda Chi				Inactive	
Mu Chi	1987	Concordia University, St. Paul	Saint Paul, Minnesota	Inactive	
**Nu Chi**	2008	College of the Holy Cross	Worcester, Massachusetts	Active	
**Xi Chi**	1987	Canisius University	Buffalo, New York	Active	
**Omicron Chi**	1987	Southern Connecticut State University	New Haven, Connecticut	Active	
**Pi Chi**	1987	Saint Francis University	Loretto, Pennsylvania	Active	
**Rho Chi**	1987	University of Maine	Orono, Maine	Active	
**Sigma Chi**	1987	Moravian University	Bethlehem, Pennsylvania	Active	
Tau Chi	1987	Spring Arbor University	Spring Arbor, Michigan	Inactive	
Upsilon Chi	1987	DeSales University	Center Valley, Pennsylvania	Inactive	
**Phi Chi**	1987	University of the Pacific	Stockton, California	Active	
Chi Chi				Inactive	
Psi Chi				Inactive	
**Omega Chi**	1988	University of Arkansas at Monticello	Monticello, Arkansas	Active	
Alpha Psi	1988	Metropolitan State University of Denver	Denver, Colorado	Inactive	
**Beta Psi**	1988	Shorter University	Rome, Georgia	Active	
Gamma Psi	1988	DePaul University	Chicago, Illinois	Inactive	
**Delta Psi**	1988	Westminster College	Fulton, Missouri	Active	
**Epsilon Psi**	1988	Ursuline College	Pepper Pike, Ohio	Active	
Zeta Psi	1988	University of Northern Colorado	Greeley, Colorado	Inactive	
**Eta Psi**	1988	Pepperdine University	Malibu, California	Active	
Theta Psi	1988	Milligan College	Milligan College, Tennessee	Inactive	
**Iota Psi**	1988	University of St. Thomas	Saint Paul, Minnesota	Active	
Kappa Psi	1988	Fort Lewis College	Durango, Colorado	Inactive	
**Lambda Psi**	1988	Colorado State University Pueblo	Pueblo, Colorado	Active	
Mu Psi				Inactive	
**Nu Psi**	1988	Mary Baldwin University	Staunton, Virginia	Active	
**Xi Psi**	1988	Saint Peter's University	Jersey City, New Jersey	Active	
**Omicron Psi**	1988	Auburn University at Montgomery	Montgomery, Alabama	Active	
Pi Psi	1989	University of Hartford	West Hartford, Connecticut	Inactive	
**Rho Psi**	1989	Fort Hays State University	Hays, Kansas	Active	
**Sigma Psi**	1989	Taylor University	Upland, Indiana	Active	
Tau Psi	1989	University of Wisconsin–Parkside	Kenosha, Wisconsin	Inactive	
**Upsilon Psi**	1989	St. Mary's University, Texas	San Antonio, Texas	Active	
**Phi Psi**	1989	Shippensburg University	Shippensburg, Pennsylvania	Active	
Chi Psi				Inactive	
Psi Psi	1989	Missouri Baptist University	Creve Coeur, Missouri	Inactive	
**Omega Psi**	1989	Ithaca College	Ithaca, New York	Active	
Alpha Omega				Inactive	
**Beta Omega**	1964	Fairmont State University	Fairmont, West Virginia	Active	
Beta Omega	1989	University of Texas at San Antonio	San Antonio, Texas	Inactive	
Gamma Omega				Inactive	
**Delta Omega**	1989	Framingham State University	Framingham, Massachusetts	Active	
**Epsilon Omega**	1989	University of Texas at Tyler	Tyler, Texas	Active	
**Zeta Omega**	1989	Mars Hill University	Mars Hill, North Carolina	Active	
Eta Omega	1989	University of Southern California	Los Angeles, California	Inactive	
Theta Omega				Inactive	
**Iota Omega**	1989	Franklin Pierce University	Rindge, New Hampshire	Active	
**Kappa Omega**	1989	John Brown University	Siloam Springs, Arkansas	Active	
**Lambda Omega**	1989	California State University, Sacramento	Sacramento, California	Active	
**Mu Omega**	1989	State University of New York at Oneonta	Oneonta, New York	Active	
**Nu Omega**	1989	Thomas More University	Crestview Hills, Kentucky	Active	
Xi Omega				Inactive	
**Omicron Omega**	1989	Texas A&M University–Texarkana	Texarkana, Texas	Active	
Pi Omega	1989	Northern Kentucky University	Highland Heights, Kentucky	Inactive	
**Rho Omega**	1989	University of Houston–Clear Lake	Houston, Texas	Active	
**Sigma Omega**	1990	Wake Forest University	Winston-Salem, North Carolina	Active	
**Tau Omega**	1990	University of Maryland Global Campus	Adelphi, Maryland	Active	
Upsilon Omega	1990	Fontbonne University	Clayton, Missouri	Inactive	
Phi Omega	1990	Rust College	Holly Springs, Mississippi	Inactive	
Chi Omega				Inactive	
Psi Omega				Inactive	
**Omega Omega**	1990	Ramapo College	Mahwah, New Jersey	Active	
**Alpha Alpha Alpha**	1990	Saint Leo University	St. Leo, Florida	Active	
Alpha Alpha Beta				Inactive	
Alpha Alpha Gamma	1990	Trine University	Angola, Indiana	Inactive	
**Alpha Alpha Delta**	1990	University of Pittsburgh at Greensburg	Greensburg, Pennsylvania	Active	
Alpha Alpha Epsilon	1990	Valdosta State University	Valdosta, Georgia	Inactive	
**Alpha Alpha Zeta**	1990	Niagara University	Niagara University, New York	Active	
**Alpha Alpha Eta**	1990	Tennessee State University	Mount Juliet, Tennessee	Active	
**Alpha Alpha Theta**	1990	Elizabethtown College	Elizabethtown, Pennsylvania	Active	
**Alpha Alpha Iota**	1990	University of Texas Permian Basin	Odessa, Texas	Active	
**Alpha Alpha Kappa**	1990	Florida International University	Miami, Florida	Active	
Alpha Alpha Lambda	1990	University of Rio Grande	Rio Grande, Ohio	Inactive	
Alpha Alpha Mu	1990	Southeastern University	Lakeland, Florida	Inactive	
**Alpha Alpha Nu**	1990	Roger Williams University	Bristol, Rhode Island	Active	
**Alpha Alpha Xi**	1990	Barry University	Miami Shores, Florida	Active	
**Alpha Alpha Omicron**	December 1990	Hampden–Sydney College	Hampden Sydney, Virginia	Active	
**Alpha Alpha Pi**	1990	Alma College	Alma, Michigan	Active	
**Alpha Alpha Rho**	1990	Columbia College	Columbia, Missouri	Active	
**Alpha Alpha Sigma**	1990	Russell Sage College	Troy, New York	Active	
**Alpha Alpha Tau**	1990	Presbyterian College	Clinton, South Carolina	Active	
**Alpha Alpha Upsilon**	1994	University of North Carolina Wilmington	Wilmington, North Carolina	Active	
**Alpha Alpha Phi**	1991	Mercy University	Dobbs Ferry, New York	Active	
Alpha Alpha Chi				Inactive	
**Alpha Alpha Psi**	1991	Hastings College	Hastings, Nebraska	Active	
**Alpha Alpha Omega**	1991	University of Georgia	Athens, Georgia	Active	
Alpha Beta Alpha	1991	University of Missouri–St. Louis	St. Louis, Missouri	Inactive	
**Alpha Beta Beta**	1991	Clark Atlanta University	Atlanta, Georgia	Active	
**Alpha Beta Gamma**	1991	Wingate University	Wingate, North Carolina	Active	
Alpha Beta Delta	1991	Brigham Young University–Hawaii	Lāʻie, Hawaii	Inactive	
**Alpha Beta Epsilon**	1991	University of North Georgia	Dahlonega, Georgia	Active	
**Alpha Beta Zeta**	1991	Hampton University	Hampton, Virginia	Active	
**Alpha Beta Eta**	1991	Xavier University of Louisiana	New Orleans, Louisiana	Active	
**Alpha Beta Theta**		Wheaton College	Wheaton, Illinois	Active	
**Alpha Beta Iota**	1991	Lee University	Cleveland, Tennessee	Active	
Alpha Beta Kappa	1992	University of Arkansas at Little Rock	Little Rock, Arkansas	Inactive	
**Alpha Beta Lambda**	1992	Lander University	Greenwood, South Carolina	Active	
**Alpha Beta Mu**	1992	Emporia State University	Emporia, Kansas	Active	
Alpha Beta Nu	1992	Covenant College	Lookout Mountain, Georgia	Inactive	
**Alpha Beta Xi**	1992	Luther College	Decorah, Iowa	Active	
Alpha Beta Omicron	1992	Marian University	Indianapolis, Indiana	Inactive	
Alpha Beta Pi	1992	Dominican University	River Forest, Illinois	Inactive	
Alpha Beta Rho	1992	Concordia University	Portland, Oregon	Inactive	
**Alpha Beta Sigma**	1992	Huntington University	Huntington, Indiana	Active	
Alpha Beta Tau				Inactive	
**Alpha Beta Upsilon**	1994	Tulane University	New Orleans, Louisiana	Active	
**Alpha Beta Phi**	1992	Ashland University	Ashland, Ohio	Active	
**Alpha Beta Chi**	1992	LaGrange College	LaGrange, Georgia	Active	
**Alpha Beta Psi**	1992	Avila University	Kansas City, Missouri	Active	
Alpha Beta Omega	1992	University of Northwestern – St. Paul	Saint Paul, Minnesota	Inactive	
**Alpha Gamma Alpha**	1992	Wilkes University	Wilkes-Barre, Pennsylvania	Active	
**Alpha Gamma Beta**	1993	Creighton University	Omaha, Nebraska	Active	
**Alpha Gamma Gamma**	1993	William Carey University	Hattiesburg, Mississippi	Active	
**Alpha Gamma Delta**	1993	Christian Brothers University	Memphis, Tennessee	Active	
Alpha Gamma Epsilon				Inactive	
**Alpha Gamma Zeta**	1993	Seton Hall University	South Orange, New Jersey	Active	
**Alpha Gamma Eta**	1993	Newberry College	Newberry, South Carolina	Active	
**Alpha Gamma Theta**	1993	University of Dayton	Dayton, Ohio	Active	
**Alpha Gamma Iota**	1993	Siena University	Loudonville, New York	Active	
**Alpha Gamma Kappa**	1993	Shepherd University	Shepherdstown, West Virginia	Active	
Alpha Gamma Lambda	1993	Dakota State University	Madison, South Dakota	Inactive	
**Alpha Gamma Mu**	1993	Missouri University of Science and Technology	Rolla, Missouri	Active	
**Alpha Gamma Nu**	1993	University of the Southern Caribbean	Port of Spain, Trinidad and Tobago	Active	
**Alpha Gamma Xi**	1993	Schreiner University	Kerrville, Texas	Active	
**Alpha Gamma Omicron**	1994	Texas A&M International University	Laredo, Texas	Active	
**Alpha Gamma Pi**	1993	Morris College	Sumter, South Carolina	Active	
**Alpha Gamma Rho**	1993	Georgia Southern University–Armstrong Campus	Savannah, Georgia	Active	
**Alpha Gamma Sigma**	1993	Lincoln Memorial University	Harrogate, Tennessee	Active	
Alpha Gamma Tau	1994–c. 2021	Judson College	Marion, Alabama	Inactive	(Note: The college closed in July 2021.)
**Alpha Gamma Upsilon**	1993	York University	York, Nebraska	Active	
**Alpha Gamma Phi**	1993	La Roche University	Pittsburgh, Pennsylvania	Active	
Alpha Gamma Chi				Inactive	
**Alpha Gamma Psi**	1993	Huntingdon College	Montgomery, Alabama	Active	
**Alpha Gamma Omega**	1994	University of California, Los Angeles	Los Angeles, California	Active	
**Alpha Delta Alpha**	1994	Tougaloo College	Tougaloo, Mississippi	Active	
Alpha Delta Beta	1994	Brewton–Parker College	Mount Vernon, Georgia	Inactive	
**Alpha Delta Gamma**	1994	Loyola Marymount University	Los Angeles, California	Active	
**Alpha Delta Delta**	1994	Pacific Union College	Angwin, California	Active	
Alpha Delta Epsilon	1994	University of Missouri	Columbia, Missouri	Inactive	
**Alpha Delta Zeta**	1994	California State University, Fullerton	Fullerton, California	Active	
**Alpha Delta Eta**	1994	St. Catherine University	Saint Paul, Minnesota	Active	
**Alpha Delta Theta**	1994	Virginia Military Institute	Lexington, Virginia	Active	
**Alpha Delta Iota**	1994	State University of New York at Plattsburgh	Plattsburgh, New York	Active	
Alpha Delta Kappa	1994	University of Denver	Denver, Colorado	Inactive	
**Alpha Delta Lambda**	1994	Chatham University	Pittsburgh, Pennsylvania	Active	
**Alpha Delta Mu**	1994	Cumberland University	Lebanon, Tennessee	Active	
**Alpha Delta Nu**	1994	University of the Southwest	Hobbs, New Mexico	Active	
Alpha Delta Xi	1994	University of the Incarnate Word	San Antonio, Texas	Inactive	
**Alpha Delta Omicron**	1994	Marietta College	Marietta, Ohio	Active	
**Alpha Delta Pi**	1994	Williams Baptist University	Walnut Ridge, Arkansas	Active	
Alpha Delta Rho				Inactive	
Alpha Delta Sigma	1994	Southwest Minnesota State University	Marshall, Minnesota	Inactive	
**Alpha Delta Tau**	1994	University of Evansville	Evansville, Indiana	Active	
**Alpha Delta Upsilon**	1994	Virginia State University	Petersburg, Virginia	Active	
**Alpha Delta Phi**	1994	Piedmont University	Demorest, Georgia	Active	
**Alpha Delta Chi**	1995	Utica University	Utica, New York	Active	
**Alpha Delta Psi**	1995	University of Maryland, Baltimore County	Catonsville, Maryland	Active	
**Alpha Delta Omega**	1995	Stillman College	Tuscaloosa, Alabama	Active	
**Alpha Epsilon Alpha**	1995	The College of New Jersey	Ewing Township, New Jersey	Active	
**Alpha Epsilon Beta**	1995	King's College	Wilkes-Barre, Pennsylvania	Active	
**Alpha Epsilon Gamma**	1995	Tennessee Wesleyan University	Athens, Tennessee	Active	
**Alpha Epsilon Delta**	1995	Eastern Connecticut State University	Willimantic, Connecticut	Active	
**Alpha Epsilon Epsilon**	1995	University of Mount Saint Vincent	Riverdale, Bronx, New York City, New York	Active	
**Alpha Epsilon Zeta**	1995	Greensboro College	Greensboro, North Carolina	Active	
**Alpha Epsilon Eta**	1995	Stephens College	Columbia, Missouri	Active	
Alpha Epsilon Theta				Inactive	
**Alpha Epsilon Iota**	1996	University of Montana Western	Dillon, Montana	Active	
**Alpha Epsilon Kappa**	1995	Belhaven University	Jackson, Mississippi	Active	
Alpha Epsilon Lambda	1995	University of Mount Olive	Mount Olive, North Carolina	Inactive	
**Alpha Epsilon Mu**	1995	Loyola University Chicago	Chicago, Illinois	Active	
**Alpha Epsilon Nu**	1995	University of Alaska Anchorage	Anchorage, Alaska	Active	
Alpha Epsilon Xi	1995	Saint Xavier University	Chicago, Illinois	Inactive	
**Alpha Epsilon Omicron**	1995	Whitworth University	Spokane, Washington	Active	
**Alpha Epsilon Pi**	1995	University of New Mexico	Albuquerque, New Mexico	Active	
**Alpha Epsilon Rho**	1995	University of the District of Columbia	Washington, D.C.	Active	
**Alpha Epsilon Sigma**	November 20, 1995	Methodist University	Fayetteville, North Carolina	Active	
**Alpha Epsilon Tau**	1996	Azusa Pacific University	Azusa, California	Active	
**Alpha Epsilon Upsilon**	1996	Gannon University	Erie, Pennsylvania	Active	
**Alpha Epsilon Phi**	1996	College of Charleston	Charleston, South Carolina	Active	
**Alpha Epsilon Chi**	1996	University of Tennessee	Knoxville, Tennessee	Active	
**Alpha Epsilon Psi**	1996	William Paterson University	Wayne, New Jersey	Active	
**Alpha Epsilon Omega**	1996	Flagler College	St. Augustine, Florida	Active	
Alpha Zeta Alpha	1996	University of Puerto Rico at Cayey	Cayey, Puerto Rico	Inactive	
**Alpha Zeta Beta**	1996	Assumption University	Worcester, Massachusetts	Active	
Alpha Zeta Gamma	1996	Troy University at Dothan	Dothan, Alabama	Inactive	
**Alpha Zeta Delta**	1996	Lincoln University	Lincoln University, Pennsylvania	Active	
**Alpha Zeta Epsilon**	1996	Carroll College	Helena, Montana	Active	
Alpha Zeta Zeta	1996–c. 2019	Marygrove College	Detroit, Michigan	Inactive	(Note: The college closed in 2019.)
Alpha Zeta Eta				Inactive	
**Alpha Zeta Theta**	1996	Biola University	La Mirada, California	Active	
**Alpha Zeta Iota**	1996	Chapman University	Orange, California	Active	
**Alpha Zeta Kappa**	1996	Westmont College	Montecito, California	Active	
**Alpha Zeta Lambda**		Loras College	Dubuque, Iowa	Active	
**Alpha Zeta Mu**	1997	Palm Beach Atlantic University	West Palm Beach, Florida	Active	
**Alpha Zeta Nu**	1997	Northern Arizona University	Flagstaff, Arizona	Active	
Alpha Zeta Xi	1997	University of Guam	Mangilao, Guam	Inactive	
**Alpha Zeta Omicron**		Calumet College of St. Joseph	Whiting, Indiana	Active	
Alpha Zeta Pi	1997	Saint Mary's University of Minnesota	Winona, Minnesota	Inactive	
**Alpha Zeta Rho**	1997	Chowan University	Murfreesboro, North Carolina	Active	
**Alpha Zeta Sigma**	1997	Fitchburg State University	Fitchburg, Massachusetts	Active	
Alpha Zeta Tau				Inactive	
Alpha Zeta Upsilon	1997	Austin Peay State University	Clarksville, Tennessee	Inactive	
Alpha Zeta Phi	1997	Rollins College	Winter Park, Florida	Inactive	
Alpha Zeta Chi	1997	University of Central Arkansas	Conway, Arkansas	Inactive	
**Alpha Zeta Psi**	1997	New Mexico Highlands University	Las Vegas, New Mexico	Active	
Alpha Zeta Omega				Inactive	
**Alpha Eta Alpha**	1997	Charleston Southern University	North Charleston, South Carolina	Active	
**Alpha Eta Beta**	1997	University of the Virgin Islands	Saint Thomas, U.S. Virgin Islands	Active	
Alpha Eta Gamma	1997	California Lutheran University	Thousand Oaks, California	Inactive	
**Alpha Eta Delta**	1997	St. Mary's College of Maryland	St. Mary's City, Maryland	Active	
**Alpha Eta Epsilon**	1997	Park University	Parkville, Missouri	Active	
**Alpha Eta Zeta**	1997	Ripon College	Ripon, Wisconsin	Active	
**Alpha Eta Eta**	1997	Furman University	Greenville, South Carolina	Active	
**Alpha Eta Theta**	1997	California State University, San Bernardino	San Bernardino, California	Active	
**Alpha Eta Iota**		Brigham Young University	Provo, Utah	Active	
**Alpha Eta Kappa**	1997	Salem College	Winston-Salem, North Carolina	Active	
Alpha Eta Lambda	1997	Bethune–Cookman University	Daytona Beach, Florida	Inactive	
**Alpha Eta Mu**	1997	LeTourneau University	Longview, Texas	Active	
**Alpha Eta Nu**	1997	Southern Utah University	Cedar City, Utah	Active	
**Alpha Eta Xi**	1997	Dallas Baptist University	Dallas, Texas	Active	
Alpha Eta Omicron				Inactive	
**Alpha Eta Pi**	1998	Illinois Wesleyan University	Bloomington, Illinois	Active	
**Alpha Eta Rho**	1998	United States Air Force Academy	Air Force Academy, Colorado	Active	
**Alpha Eta Sigma**	1998	Westfield State University	Westfield, Massachusetts	Active	
Alpha Eta Tau	1998	Murray State University	Murray, Kentucky	Inactive	
**Alpha Eta Upsilon**	1998	St. John Fisher University	Rochester, New York	Active	
**Alpha Eta Phi**	1998	Widener University	Chester, Pennsylvania	Active	
Alpha Eta Chi	1998	Edinboro University of Pennsylvania	Edinboro, Pennsylvania	Inactive	
Alpha Eta Psi				Inactive	
Alpha Eta Omega				Inactive	
**Alpha Theta Alpha**	1998	University of North Carolina at Greensboro	Greensboro, North Carolina	Active	
**Alpha Theta Beta**	1998	Friends University	Wichita, Kansas	Active	
Alpha Theta Gamma	1998	University of Michigan–Flint	Flint, Michigan	Inactive	
**Alpha Theta Delta**	1998	Washington State University	Pullman, Washington	Active	
**Alpha Theta Epsilon**	1998	San Diego State University	San Diego, California	Active	
**Alpha Theta Zeta**	1998	University of Alaska Fairbanks	Fairbanks, Alaska	Active	
**Alpha Theta Eta**	1998	Kansas State University	Manhattan, Kansas	Active	
Alpha Theta Theta				Inactive	
**Alpha Theta Iota**	1998	Lubbock Christian University	Lubbock, Texas	Active	
**Alpha Theta Kappa**	1998	Geneva College	Beaver Falls, Pennsylvania	Active	
**Alpha Theta Lambda**	1998	Saint Vincent College	Latrobe, Pennsylvania	Active	
**Alpha Theta Mu**	1998	Texas A&M University–Corpus Christi	Corpus Christi, Texas	Active	
**Alpha Theta Nu**	1998	Brenau University	Gainesville, Georgia	Active	(Note: Chapter was acquired through the national merger with Lambda Iota Tau in 2016.)
Alpha Theta Xi	1998	Benedictine University	Lisle, Illinois	Inactive	
**Alpha Theta Omicron**	1998	Wichita State University	Wichita, Kansas	Active	
**Alpha Theta Pi**	1999	Livingstone College	Salisbury, North Carolina	Active	
**Alpha Theta Rho**	1999	University of Massachusetts Lowell	Lowell, Massachusetts	Active	
Alpha Theta Sigma	1999	Emmanuel College	Franklin Springs, Georgia	Inactive	
**Alpha Theta Tau**	1999	Washington & Jefferson College	Washington, Pennsylvania	Active	
**Alpha Theta Upsilon**	1999	Valley City State University	Valley City, North Dakota	Active	
**Alpha Theta Phi**	1999	Ohio University	Athens, Ohio	Active	
Alpha Theta Chi				Inactive	
**Alpha Theta Psi**	1999	University of Oklahoma	Norman, Oklahoma	Active	
**Alpha Theta Omega**	1999	Quinnipiac University	Hamden, Connecticut	Active	
**Alpha Iota Alpha**	1999	Faulkner University	Montgomery, Alabama	Active	
**Alpha Iota Beta**	1999	University of Texas at El Paso	El Paso, Texas	Active	
Alpha Iota Gamma				Inactive	
Alpha Iota Delta	1999	University of Sioux Falls	Sioux Falls, South Dakota	Inactive	
**Alpha Iota Epsilon**	1999	Florida Gulf Coast University	Fort Myers, Florida	Active	
Alpha Iota Zeta	1999	Claflin University	Orangeburg, South Carolina	Inactive	
**Alpha Iota Eta**	1999	Oakland University	Rochester Hills, Michigan	Active	
**Alpha Iota Theta**	2000	Penn State Altoona	Altoona, Pennsylvania	Active	
**Alpha Iota Iota**	2000	University of Colorado Colorado Springs	Colorado Springs, Colorado	Active	
**Alpha Iota Kappa**	2000	Thiel College	Greenville, Pennsylvania	Active	
**Alpha Iota Lambda**	2001	William Peace University	Raleigh, North Carolina	Active	
**Alpha Iota Mu**	2000	Bridgewater State University	Bridgewater, Massachusetts	Active	
Alpha Iota Nu	2000	Purdue University Calumet	Hammond, Indiana	Inactive	
Alpha Iota Xi				Inactive	
**Alpha Iota Omicron**	2000	St. Joseph's University, Long Island Campus	Patchogue, New York	Active	
**Alpha Iota Pi**	2000	Salve Regina University	Newport, Rhode Island	Active	
**Alpha Iota Rho**	2000	Meredith College	Raleigh, North Carolina	Active	
**Alpha Iota Sigma**	2000	University of Colorado Boulder	Boulder, Colorado	Active	
**Alpha Iota Tau**	2001	New Jersey City University	Jersey City, New Jersey	Active	
**Alpha Iota Upsilon**	2000	La Sierra University	Riverside, California	Active	
**Alpha Iota Phi**	2000	Rochester Christian University	Rochester Hills, Michigan	Active	
**Alpha Iota Chi**	2000	Aurora University	Aurora, Illinois	Active	
**Alpha Iota Psi**	2001	Oral Roberts University	Tulsa, Oklahoma	Active	
**Alpha Iota Omega**	2000	Capital University	Columbus, Ohio	Active	
Alpha Kappa Alpha	2000	Centenary University	Hackettstown, New Jersey	Inactive	
**Alpha Kappa Beta**	2001	State University of New York at Old Westbury	Old Westbury, New York	Active	
**Alpha Kappa Gamma**	2001	Marymount University	Arlington, Virginia	Active	
**Alpha Kappa Delta**	2001	Cedarville University	Cedarville, Ohio	Active	
Alpha Kappa Epsilon				Inactive	
Alpha Kappa Zeta	2001	Montana State University	Bozeman, Montana	Inactive	
**Alpha Kappa Eta**	2001	Arcadia University	Glenside, Pennsylvania	Active	
**Alpha Kappa Theta**	2001	Fairleigh Dickinson University	Madison, New Jersey	Active	
Alpha Kappa Iota	2001	Wilmington College	Wilmington, Ohio	Inactive	
Alpha Kappa Kappa				Inactive	
Alpha Kappa Lambda	2002	Bluefield College	Bluefield, Virginia	Inactive	
Alpha Kappa Mu	2002	Spalding University	Louisville, Kentucky	Inactive	
Alpha Kappa Nu				Inactive	
**Alpha Kappa Xi**	2002	Bryan College	Dayton, Tennessee	Active	
**Alpha Kappa Omicron**	2002	St. Thomas Aquinas College	Sparkill, New York	Active	
**Alpha Kappa Pi**	2002	Plymouth State University	Plymouth, New Hampshire	Active	
**Alpha Kappa Rho**	2002	North Greenville University	Tigerville, South Carolina	Active	
**Alpha Kappa Sigma**	2002	Regis College	Weston, Massachusetts	Active	
**Alpha Kappa Tau**	2002	California State University, Chico	Chico, California	Active	
**Alpha Kappa Upsilon**	2002	Columbus State University	Columbus, Georgia	Active	
**Alpha Kappa Phi**	2002	Lindsey Wilson College	Columbia, Kentucky	Active	
**Alpha Kappa Chi**	2002	Southern Adventist University	Collegedale, Tennessee	Active	
**Alpha Kappa Psi**	2002	University of Olivet	Olivet, Michigan	Active	
**Alpha Kappa Omega**	2002	University of Houston–Downtown	Houston, Texas	Active	
Alpha Lambda Alpha	2002	Appalachian State University	Boone, North Carolina	Inactive	
Alpha Lambda Beta				Inactive	
Alpha Lambda Gamma	2002	Florida Memorial University	Miami Gardens, Florida	Inactive	
**Alpha Lambda Delta**	2003	Sacred Heart University	Fairfield, Connecticut	Active	
**Alpha Lambda Epsilon**	2003	Western Connecticut State University	Danbury, Connecticut	Active	
**Alpha Lambda Zeta**	2003	University of Arkansas–Fort Smith	Fort Smith, Arkansas	Active	
Alpha Lambda Eta				Inactive	
**Alpha Lambda Theta**	2003	Denison University	Granville, Ohio	Active	
**Alpha Lambda Iota**	2003	University of Wisconsin–Green Bay	Green Bay, Wisconsin	Active	
**Alpha Lambda Kappa**	2003	Northwest University	Kirkland, Washington	Active	
**Alpha Lambda Lambda**	2003	University of South Carolina Upstate	Spartanburg, South Carolina	Active	
**Alpha Lambda Mu**	2003	Miles College	Fairfield, Alabama	Active	
**Alpha Lambda Nu**	2003	Ohio Dominican University	Columbus, Ohio	Active	
**Alpha Lambda Xi**	2003	University of Minnesota Morris	Morris, Minnesota	Active	
**Alpha Lambda Omicron**	2003	Stevenson University	Owings Mills, Maryland	Active	
**Alpha Lambda Pi**	2003	University of Pikeville	Pikeville, Kentucky	Active	
Alpha Lambda Rho				Inactive	
Alpha Lambda Sigma				Inactive	
Alpha Lambda Tau	2004	King University	Bristol, Tennessee	Inactive	
Alpha Lambda Upsilon	2004	Adrian College	Adrian, Michigan	Inactive	
Alpha Lambda Phi	2004	Lindsey Wilson College	Columbia, Kentucky	Inactive	
**Alpha Lambda Chi**	2004	Adelphi University	Garden City, New York	Active	
**Alpha Lambda Psi**	2004	University of Texas Rio Grande Valley	Edinburg, Texas	Active	
**Alpha Lambda Omega**	2004	University of Pittsburgh at Bradford	Bradford, Pennsylvania	Active	
**Alpha Mu Alpha**	2004	University of Tennessee Southern	Pulaski, Tennessee	Active	
**Alpha Mu Beta**	2004	St. Lawrence University	Canton, New York	Active	
**Alpha Mu Gamma**	2004	Rockhurst University	Kansas City, Missouri	Active	
**Alpha Mu Delta**	2004	Marymount Manhattan College	Manhattan, New York City, New York	Active	
**Alpha Mu Epsilon**	2004	Allegheny College	Meadville, Pennsylvania	Active	
**Alpha Mu Zeta**	2004	Baldwin Wallace University	Berea, Ohio	Active	
**Alpha Mu Eta**	2004	Augusta University	Augusta, Georgia	Active	
**Alpha Mu Theta**	2004	Juniata College	Huntingdon, Pennsylvania	Active	
**Alpha Mu Iota**	2004	Louisiana State University of Alexandria	Alexandria, Louisiana	Active	
**Alpha Mu Kappa**	2004	Marist University	Poughkeepsie, New York	Active	
**Alpha Mu Lambda**	2004	Central Connecticut State University	New Britain, Connecticut	Active	
**Alpha Mu Mu**	2004	Penn State Brandywine	Media, Pennsylvania	Active	
**Alpha Mu Nu**	2004	Washington College	Chestertown, Maryland	Active	
**Alpha Mu Xi**	2004	California State University, Stanislaus	Turlock, California	Active	
**Alpha Mu Omicron**	2004	University of Wyoming	Laramie, Wyoming	Active	
**Alpha Mu Pi**	2004	Purdue University Northwest	Westville, Indiana	Active	
Alpha Mu Rho	2004	Penn State Mont Alto	Mont Alto, Pennsylvania	Inactive	
Alpha Mu Sigma	2005	Southern Virginia University	Buena Vista, Virginia	Inactive	
**Alpha Mu Tau**	2005	Vanguard University	Costa Mesa, California	Active	
**Alpha Mu Upsilon**	2005	Mount Saint Mary College	Newburgh, New York	Active	
**Alpha Mu Phi**	2005	University of South Dakota	Vermillion, South Dakota	Active	
**Alpha Mu Chi**	2005	Penn State Abington	Abington, Pennsylvania	Active	
**Alpha Mu Psi**	2005	Dillard University	New Orleans, Louisiana	Active	
**Alpha Mu Omega**	2005	Mount Vernon Nazarene University	Mount Vernon, Ohio	Active	
**Alpha Nu Alpha**	2005	Hilbert College	Hamburg, New York	Active	
Alpha Nu Beta	2005	University of Washington	Seattle, Washington	Inactive	
**Alpha Nu Gamma**	2005	University of Southern Mississippi	Hattiesburg, Mississippi	Active	
Alpha Nu Delta	2005	University of Massachusetts Boston	Boston, Massachusetts	Inactive	
Alpha Nu Epsilon				Inactive	
**Alpha Nu Zeta**	2005	Stony Brook University	Stony Brook, New York	Active	
Alpha Nu Eta	2005	California State University Channel Islands	Camarillo, California	Inactive	
**Alpha Nu Theta**	2005	Carlow University	Pittsburgh, Pennsylvania	Active	
**Alpha Nu Iota**	2005	Nova Southeastern University	Fort Lauderdale, Florida	Active	
**Alpha Nu Kappa**	2005	Lesley University	Cambridge, Massachusetts	Active	
Alpha Nu Lambda	2005	St. Edward's University	Austin, Texas	Inactive	
**Alpha Nu Mu**	2005	University of San Diego	San Diego, California	Active	
**Alpha Nu Nu**	2005	College of the Ozarks	Point Lookout, Missouri	Active	
Alpha Nu Xi	2005	Clayton State University	Morrow, Georgia	Inactive	
Alpha Nu Omicron	2005	Siena Heights University		Inactive	
**Alpha Nu Pi**	2005	Western Michigan University	Kalamazoo, Michigan	Active	
Alpha Nu Rho	2005	Cheyney University	Cheyney, Pennsylvania	Inactive	
**Alpha Nu Sigma**	2005	North Central University	Minneapolis, Minnesota	Active	
Alpha Nu Tau	2005	University of Illinois Springfield	Springfield, Illinois	Inactive	
**Alpha Nu Upsilon**	2005	University of Wisconsin–La Crosse	La Crosse, Wisconsin	Active	
**Alpha Nu Phi**	2006	Grand View University	Des Moines, Iowa	Active	
**Alpha Nu Chi**	2006	University of Dubuque	Dubuque, Iowa	Active	
**Alpha Nu Psi**	2006	Northwestern Oklahoma State University	Alva, Oklahoma	Active	
Alpha Nu Omega	2006	Southwest Baptist University	Bolivar, Missouri	Inactive	
**Alpha Xi Alpha**	2006	University of North Dakota	Grand Forks, North Dakota	Active	
**Alpha Xi Beta**	2006	Chestnut Hill College	Philadelphia, Pennsylvania	Active	
Alpha Xi Gamma	2006	Wabash College	Crawfordsville, Indiana	Inactive	
Alpha Xi Delta	2006	Catawba College	Salisbury, North Carolina	Inactive	
**Alpha Xi Epsilon**	2006	Wittenberg University	Springfield, Ohio	Active	
**Alpha Xi Zeta**	2006	Nevada State University	Henderson, Nevada	Active	
**Alpha Xi Eta**	2006	Saint Mary's College	Notre Dame, Indiana	Active	
Alpha Xi Theta	2006	Tusculum College	Tusculum, Tennessee	Inactive	
**Alpha Xi Iota**	2006	University of Science and Arts of Oklahoma	Chickasha, Oklahoma	Active	
**Alpha Xi Kappa**	2006	Ferris State University	Big Rapids, Michigan	Active	
**Alpha Xi Lambda**	2006	Southern Wesleyan University	Central, South Carolina	Active	
**Alpha Xi Mu**	2006	Augustana University	Sioux Falls, South Dakota	Active	
**Alpha Xi Nu**	2006	University of Holy Cross	New Orleans, Louisiana	Active	
**Alpha Xi Xi**	2006	High Point University	High Point, North Carolina	Active	
**Alpha Xi Omicron**	2006	State University of New York at Fredonia	Fredonia, New York	Active	
**Alpha Xi Pi**	2006	Western Colorado University	Gunnison, Colorado	Active	
Alpha Xi Rho	2006	West Virginia State University	Institute, West Virginia	Inactive	
**Alpha Xi Sigma**	2006	Randolph College	Lynchburg, Virginia	Active	
**Alpha Xi Tau**	2006	Gonzaga University	Spokane, Washington	Active	
**Alpha Xi Upsilon**	2006	Alfred University	Alfred, New York	Active	
**Alpha Xi Phi**	2006	University of South Florida St. Petersburg	St. Petersburg, Florida	Active	
Alpha Xi Chi	2006	University of Montenegro	Podgorica, Montenegro	Inactive	
Alpha Xi Psi	2007	Eastern New Mexico University	Portales, New Mexico	Inactive	
**Alpha Xi Omega**	2007	John Jay College of Criminal Justice	New York City, New York	Active	
Alpha Omicron Alpha	2007	Walsh University	North Canton, Ohio	Inactive	
Alpha Omicron Beta	2007	North Carolina Wesleyan College	Rocky Mount, North Carolina	Inactive	
**Alpha Omicron Gamma**	2007	Wheeling University	Wheeling, West Virginia	Active	
**Alpha Omicron Delta**	2007	Blue Mountain Christian University	Blue Mountain, Mississippi	Active	
Alpha Omicron Epsilon	2007	Indiana University East	Richmond, Indiana	Inactive	
**Alpha Omicron Zeta**	2007	Colorado Christian University	Lakewood, Colorado	Active	
**Alpha Omicron Eta**	2007	Hawaii Pacific University	Honolulu, Hawaii	Active	
Alpha Omicron Theta				Inactive	
Alpha Omicron Iota	2007	Sweet Briar College	Sweet Briar, Virginia	Inactive	
Alpha Omicron Kappa	2007	Portland State University	Portland, Oregon	Inactive	
**Alpha Omicron Lambda**	2007	Hollins University	Hollins, Virginia	Active	
Alpha Omicron Mu	2007	Tennessee Temple University	Chattanooga, Tennessee	Inactive	
**Alpha Omicron Nu**	2007	Reinhardt University	Waleska, Georgia	Active	
**Alpha Omicron Xi**	2007	Springfield College	Springfield, Massachusetts	Active	
Alpha Omicron Omicron	2007	Northwest Nazarene University	Nampa, Idaho	Inactive	
**Alpha Omicron Pi**	2007	Rhode Island College	Providence, Rhode Island	Active	
**Alpha Omicron Rho**	2007	Dominican University of California	San Rafael, California	Active	
**Alpha Omicron Sigma**	2007	Shawnee State University	Portsmouth, Ohio	Active	
**Alpha Omicron Tau**	2007	University of West Florida	Pensacola, Florida	Active	
**Alpha Omicron Upsilon**	2007	Stonehill College	Easton, Massachusetts	Active	
Alpha Omicron Phi	2007–c. May 2022	Lincoln College Normal campus	Normal, Illinois	Inactive	(Note: The college closed in May 2022.)
Alpha Omicron Chi				Inactive	
**Alpha Omicron Psi**	2007	Freed–Hardeman University	Henderson, Tennessee	Active	
**Alpha Omicron Omega**	2008	University of Pennsylvania	Philadelphia, Pennsylvania	Active	
Alpha Pi Alpha				Inactive	
**Alpha Pi Beta**	2008	Hofstra University	Hempstead, New York	Active	
**Alpha Pi Gamma**	2008	Westminster College	New Wilmington, Pennsylvania	Active	
**Alpha Pi Delta**	2008	Emmanuel College	Boston, Massachusetts	Active	
Alpha Pi Epsilon	April 2008	Utah Tech University	St. George, Utah	Inactive	(Note: Chapter formed at Dixie State College, now Utah Tech University.)
**Alpha Pi Zeta**	2008	University of California, Davis	Davis, California	Active	
**Alpha Pi Eta**	2008	University of Southern Mississippi Gulf Park Campus	Long Beach, Mississippi	Active	
**Alpha Pi Theta**	2008	North Carolina State University	Raleigh, North Carolina	Active	
**Alpha Pi Iota**	2008	Ohio State University	Columbus, Ohio	Active	
**Alpha Pi Kappa**	2008	Queens University of Charlotte	Charlotte, North Carolina	Active	
Alpha Pi Lambda	2008	Ohio State University at Newark	Newark, Ohio	Inactive	
Alpha Pi Mu	2008	College of The Bahamas	Nassau, Bahamas	Inactive	
**Alpha Pi Nu**	December 2008	Gettysburg College	Gettysburg, Pennsylvania	Active	
**Alpha Pi Xi**	2009	Rutgers University–New Brunswick	New Brunswick, New Jersey	Active	
**Alpha Pi Omicron**	2009	University of Pittsburgh at Johnstown	Johnstown, Pennsylvania	Active	
**Alpha Pi Pi**	2009	Anderson University	Anderson, South Carolina	Active	
Alpha Pi Rho	2009	University of Nevada, Reno	Reno, Nevada	Inactive	
**Alpha Pi Sigma**	2009	University of North Florida	Jacksonville, Florida	Active	
**Alpha Pi Tau**	2009	University of New Orleans	New Orleans, Louisiana	Active	
**Alpha Pi Upsilon**	2009	Bushnell University	Eugene, Oregon	Active	
**Alpha Pi Phi**	2009	Rutgers University–Camden	Camden, New Jersey	Active	
Alpha Pi Chi	2009	Buffalo State University	Buffalo, New York	Inactive	
**Alpha Pi Psi**	2009	Southern New Hampshire University	Manchester, New Hampshire	Active	
**Alpha Pi Omega**	2009	Drew University	Madison, New Jersey	Active	
**Alpha Rho Alpha**	2009	Virginia Commonwealth University	Richmond, Virginia	Active	
**Alpha Rho Beta**	2009	University of South Florida Sarasota–Manatee	Sarasota, Florida	Active	
**Alpha Rho Gamma**	2009	Union College	Schenectady, New York	Active	
**Alpha Rho Delta**	2009	Randolph–Macon College	Ashland, Virginia	Active	
**Alpha Rho Epsilon**	2009	Seton Hill University	Greensburg, Pennsylvania	Active	
**Alpha Rho Zeta**	2009	Western New England University	Springfield, Massachusetts	Active	
**Alpha Rho Eta**	2009	American University of Kuwait	Salmiya, Hawalli Governorate, Kuwait	Active	
**Alpha Rho Theta**	2009	Macalester College	Saint Paul, Minnesota	Active	
Alpha Rho Iota	2009	Malone University	Canton, Ohio	Inactive	
**Alpha Rho Kappa**	2009	Maryville College	Maryville, Tennessee	Active	
**Alpha Rho Lambda**	2009	Kean University, Kean Ocean Campus	Toms River, New Jersey	Active	
**Alpha Rho Mu**	2009	University at Buffalo	Buffalo, New York	Active	
Alpha Rho Nu	2010	California State University, San Marcos	San Marcos, California	Inactive	
**Alpha Rho Xi**	2010	Delaware State University	Dover, Delaware	Active	
**Alpha Rho Omicron**	2009	George Fox University	Newberg, Oregon	Active	
**Alpha Rho Pi**	2010	Agnes Scott College	Decatur, Georgia	Active	
Alpha Rho Rho	2010	Fairleigh Dickinson University, Metropolitan Campus	Teaneck, New Jersey	Inactive	
**Alpha Rho Sigma**	2010	Middle Georgia State University	Macon, Georgia	Active	
**Alpha Rho Tau**	2010	Bethany Lutheran College	Mankato, Minnesota	Active	
**Alpha Rho Upsilon**	2010	Otterbein University	Westerville, Ohio	Active	
Alpha Rho Phi	2010	Cornerstone University	Grand Rapids, Michigan	Inactive	
**Alpha Rho Chi**	2010	St. Olaf College	Northfield, Minnesota	Active	
**Alpha Rho Psi**	2010	Transylvania University	Lexington, Kentucky	Active	
Alpha Rho Omega	2010	North Park University	Chicago, Illinois	Inactive	
Alpha Sigma Alpha	2010	York College of Pennsylvania	Spring Garden Township, Pennsylvania	Inactive	
**Alpha Sigma Beta**	2010	Belmont Abbey College	Belmont, North Carolina	Active	
**Alpha Sigma Gamma**	2010	Concord University	Athens, West Virginia	Active	
**Alpha Sigma Delta**	2010	Purdue University Fort Wayne	Fort Wayne, Indiana	Active	
**Alpha Sigma Epsilon**	2010	Misericordia University	Dallas, Pennsylvania	Active	
Alpha Sigma Zeta				Inactive	
**Alpha Sigma Eta**	2010	State University of New York at Oswego	Oswego, New York	Active	
**Alpha Sigma Theta**	2010	University of New Haven	West Haven, Connecticut	Active	
Alpha Sigma Iota	2010	Central Christian College of Kansas	McPherson, Kansas	Inactive	
Alpha Sigma Kappa	2011	Saginaw Valley State University	University Center, Michigan	Inactive	
**Alpha Sigma Lambda**	2011	Robert Morris University	Moon Township, Pennsylvania	Active	
**Alpha Sigma Mu**	2011	College of Wooster	Wooster, Ohio	Active	
Alpha Sigma Nu	2011	Lourdes University	Sylvania, Ohio	Inactive	
**Alpha Sigma Xi**	2011	Simmons University	Boston, Massachusetts	Active	
**Alpha Sigma Omicron**		Young Harris College	Young Harris, Georgia	Active	
**Alpha Sigma Pi**	2011	University of Dallas	Irving, Texas	Active	
Alpha Sigma Rho	2011	John Carroll University	University Heights, Ohio	Inactive	
Alpha Sigma Sigma	2011	University of South Carolina Beaufort	Bluffton, South Carolina	Inactive	
**Alpha Sigma Tau**	2011	Plaza College	Forest Hills, Queens, New York City, New York	Active	
Alpha Sigma Upsilon	2011	University of Hawaiʻi at West Oʻahu	Kapolei, Hawaii	Inactive	
**Alpha Sigma Phi**	2011	Bridgewater College	Bridgewater, Virginia	Active	
**Alpha Sigma Chi**	2011	Neumann University	Aston Township, Pennsylvania	Active	
Alpha Sigma Psi	2011–c. 2023	Ashford University	Clinton, Iowa	Inactive	(Note: The university was acquired by the University of Arizona in 2023.)
**Alpha Sigma Omega**	2011	Georgia Gwinnett College	Lawrenceville, Georgia	Active	
**Alpha Tau Alpha**	2011	University of Wisconsin–Superior	Superior, Wisconsin	Active	
Alpha Tau Beta	2011	University of Saint Joseph	West Hartford, Connecticut	Inactive	
Alpha Tau Gamma	2011	Georgia Gwinnett College	Lawrenceville, Georgia	Inactive	
**Alpha Tau Delta**	2012	Endicott College	Beverly, Massachusetts	Active	
**Alpha Tau Epsilon**	2012	Wilson College	Chambersburg, Pennsylvania	Active	
Alpha Tau Zeta	2012	University of New Hampshire	Durham, New Hampshire	Inactive	
Alpha Tau Eta				Inactive	
Alpha Tau Theta	2012	Gordon State College	Barnesville, Georgia	Inactive	
**Alpha Tau Iota**	2012	University of Iowa	Iowa City, Iowa	Active	
**Alpha Tau Kappa**	2012	University of Arkansas	Fayetteville, Arkansas	Active	
**Alpha Tau Lambda**	2012	Emory & Henry University	Emory, Virginia	Active	
Alpha Tau Mu	2012–c. 2014	Urbana University	Urbana, Ohio	Inactive	(Note: The college was purchased by Franklin University in 2014 and operated as a branch of the university until it closed in 2020.)
**Alpha Tau Nu**	2012	Linfield University	McMinnville, Oregon	Active	
**Alpha Tau Xi**	2013	Merrimack College	North Andover, Massachusetts	Active	
Alpha Tau Omicron				Inactive	
Alpha Tau Pi				Inactive	
**Alpha Tau Rho**	2013	Bryant University	Smithfield, Rhode Island	Active	
**Alpha Tau Sigma**	2013	California Baptist University	Riverside, California	Active	
Alpha Tau Tau				Inactive	
Alpha Tau Upsilon	2013	La Salle University	Philadelphia, Pennsylvania	Inactive	
**Alpha Tau Phi**	2013	University of Oregon	Eugene, Oregon	Active	
**Alpha Tau Chi**	2013	Mid-America Christian University	Oklahoma City, Oklahoma	Active	
Alpha Tau Psi	2013	Tiffin University	Tiffin, Ohio	Inactive	
Alpha Tau Omega	2013	Hope College	Holland, Michigan	Inactive	
Alpha Upsilon Alpha	2013	University of Connecticut	Storrs, Connecticut	Inactive	
**Alpha Upsilon Beta**	2013	Regent University	Virginia Beach, Virginia	Active	
Alpha Upsilon Gamma	2013	Weber State University	Ogden, Utah	Inactive	
Alpha Upsilon Delta	2013	Kentucky Wesleyan College	Owensboro, Kentucky	Inactive	
**Alpha Upsilon Epsilon**	2013	University of Portland	Portland, Oregon	Active	
**Alpha Upsilon Zeta**	2013	Penn State Harrisburg	Middletown, Pennsylvania	Active	
**Alpha Upsilon Eta**	2013	University of Toronto Scarborough	Toronto, Ontario, Canada	Active	
**Alpha Upsilon Theta**	2013	Dominican University New York	Orangeburg, New York	Active	
**Alpha Upsilon Iota**	2013	Ferrum College	Ferrum, Virginia	Active	
**Alpha Upsilon Kappa**	2013	Winona State University	Winona, Minnesota	Active	
Alpha Upsilon Lambda	2014	Arkansas State University	Jonesboro, Arkansas	Inactive	
**Alpha Upsilon Mu**	2014	Texas A&M University–Central Texas	Killeen, Texas	Active	
**Alpha Upsilon Nu**		University of Pittsburgh	Pittsburgh, Pennsylvania	Active	
**Alpha Upsilon Xi**	2014	Michigan State University	East Lansing, Michigan	Active	
Alpha Upsilon Omicron	2014	St. Joseph's College, Brooklyn Campus	Brooklyn, New York	Inactive	
Alpha Upsilon Pi	2014	University of Illinois Urbana-Champaign	Urbana, Illinois	Inactive	
Alpha Upsilon Rho				Inactive	
Alpha Upsilon Sigma	2014	Pacific Lutheran University	Parkland, Washington	Inactive	
**Alpha Upsilon Tau**		Wright State University	Dayton, Ohio	Active	
Alpha Upsilon Upsilon				Inactive	
**Alpha Upsilon Phi**		University of North Georgia, Gainesville Campus	Oakwood, Georgia	Active	
**Alpha Upsilon Chi**	2014	University of Illinois Chicago	Chicago, Illinois	Active	
Alpha Upsilon Psi	2014	Grand Canyon University	Phoenix, Arizona	Active	
**Alpha Upsilon Omega**	2014	Gordon College	Wenham, Massachusetts	Active	
**Alpha Phi Alpha**	2008	Providence College	Providence, Rhode Island	Active	
**Alpha Phi Beta**	2015	Southern New Hampshire University Online	Manchester, New Hampshire	Active	
Alpha Phi Gamma				Inactive	
Alpha Phi Delta	2015	DeVry University Columbus Campus	Columbus, Ohio	Inactive	
Alpha Phi Epsilon	2015	Idaho State University	Pocatello, Idaho	Inactive	
Alpha Phi Zeta				Inactive	
Alpha Phi Eta	2015	College of Staten Island	Staten Island, New York	Inactive	
**Alpha Phi Theta**	2015	Molloy University	Rockville Centre, New York	Active	
**Alpha Phi Iota**	2015	Mount St. Mary's University	Emmitsburg, Maryland	Active	
Alpha Phi Kappa	2015	Cabrini College	Radnor Township, Pennsylvania	Inactive	
**Alpha Phi Lambda**		American University in Bulgaria	Blagoevgrad, Blagoevgrad Province, Bulgaria	Active	
**Alpha Phi Mu**	2015	McDaniel College	Westminster, Maryland	Active	
Alpha Phi Nu	2015	Towson University	Towson, Maryland	Inactive	
Alpha Phi Xi	2015	Delta State University	Cleveland, Mississippi	Inactive	
**Alpha Phi Omicron**	2015	Worcester State University	Worcester, Massachusetts	Active	
**Alpha Phi Pi**	2015	Hood College	Frederick, Maryland	Active	
Alpha Phi Rho	2015	Anna Maria College	Paxton, Massachusetts	Inactive	
**Alpha Phi Sigma**	2015	Immaculata University	Immaculata, Pennsylvania	Active	
Alpha Phi Tau				Inactive	
Alpha Phi Upsilon				Inactive	
Alpha Phi Phi				Inactive	
**Alpha Phi Chi**		University of Wisconsin–Platteville	Platteville, Wisconsin	Active	
**Alpha Phi Psi**		University of North Carolina at Chapel Hill	Chapel Hill, North Carolina	Active	
**Alpha Phi Omega**	2016	Massachusetts College of Liberal Arts	North Adams, Massachusetts	Active	
Alpha Chi Alpha				Inactive	
**Alpha Chi Beta**		Indiana University Northwest	Gary, Indiana	Active	
Alpha Chi Gamma				Inactive	
Alpha Chi Delta				Inactive	
**Alpha Chi Epsilon**		Daemen University	Amherst, New York	Active	
Alpha Chi Zeta				Inactive	
**Alpha Chi Eta**		Roosevelt University	Chicago, Illinois	Active	
**Alpha Chi Theta**		Cottey College	Nevada, Missouri	Active	
**Alpha Chi Iota**	2016	Aquinas College	Grand Rapids, Michigan	Active	
**Alpha Chi Kappa**		American University of Sharjah	University City of Sharjah, United Arab Emirates	Active	
**Alpha Chi Lambda**		Utah State University Eastern	Price, Utah	Active	
**Alpha Chi Mu**		Montclair State University	Montclair, New Jersey	Active	
Alpha Chi Nu				Inactive	
**Alpha Chi Xi**		Clark University	Worcester, Massachusetts	Active	
**Alpha Chi Omicron**		Fordham University	Bronx, New York	Active	
Alpha Chi Pi				Inactive	
Alpha Chi Rho				Inactive	
**Alpha Chi Sigma**		University of Maine at Farmington	Farmington, Maine	Active	
**Alpha Chi Tau**		American Public University System	Ranson, West Virginia	Active	
Alpha Chi Upsilon				Inactive	
**Alpha Chi Phi**		Dalton State College	Dalton, Georgia	Active	
Alpha Chi Chi				Inactive	
**Alpha Chi Psi**		Governors State University	University Park, Illinois	Active	
Alpha Psi Alpha				Inactive	
**Alpha Psi Beta**	2016	Longwood University	Farmville, Virginia	Active	
**Alpha Psi Gamma**		National University, Los Angeles Campus	Los Angeles, California	Active	
**Alpha Psi Delta**		Langston University	Langston, Oklahoma	Active	
Alpha Psi Epsilon				Inactive	
**Alpha Psi Zeta**		Southern University	Baton Rouge, Louisiana	Active	
Alpha Psi Eta				Inactive	
**Alpha Psi Theta**		California State Polytechnic University, Humboldt	Arcata, California	Active	
Alpha Psi Iota				Inactive	
Alpha Psi Kappa				Inactive	
**Alpha Psi Lambda**		Austin College	Sherman, Texas	Active	
**Alpha Psi Mu**		Concordia University Texas	Austin, Texas	Active	
**Alpha Psi Nu**		University of Texas at Dallas	Richardson, Texas	Active	
**Alpha Psi Xi**		Florida College	Temple Terrace, Florida	Active	
**Alpha Psi Omicron**		Kent State University at Stark	Jackson Township, Ohio	Active	
**Alpha Psi Pi**		Manchester University	North Manchester, Indiana	Active	
Alpha Psi Rho				Inactive	
Alpha Psi Sigma				Inactive	
Alpha Psi Tau				Inactive	
Alpha Psi Upsilon				Inactive	
Alpha Psi Phi				Inactive	
**Alpha Psi Chi**		Saint Joseph's College of Maine	Standish, Maine	Active	
**Alpha Psi Psi**		College of Coastal Georgia	Brunswick, Georgia	Active	
Alpha Psi Omega				Inactive	
**Alpha Omega Alpha**		St. Ambrose University	Davenport, Iowa	Active	
**Alpha Omega Beta**		Harriet L. Wilkes Honors College	Jupiter, Florida	Active	
Alpha Omega Gamma				Inactive	
**Alpha Omega Delta**		Sewanee: The University of the South	Sewanee, Tennessee	Active	
Alpha Omega Epsilon				Inactive	
**Alpha Omega Zeta**	2016	Tuskegee University	Tuskegee, Alabama	Active	
**Alpha Omega Eta**		Grace College & Seminary	Winona Lake, Indiana	Active	
**Alpha Omega Theta**		Philander Smith University	Little Rock, Arkansas	Active	
**Alpha Omega Iota**		University of Massachusetts Dartmouth	Dartmouth, Massachusetts	Active	
**Alpha Omega Kappa**		Trinity College	Hartford, Connecticut	Active	
**Alpha Omega Lambda**		Lafayette College	Easton, Pennsylvania	Active	
**Alpha Omega Mu**		Vanderbilt University	Nashville, Tennessee	Active	
**Alpha Omega Nu**		Penn State Scranton	Dunmore, Pennsylvania	Active	
**Alpha Omega Xi**		George Mason University	Fairfax, Virginia	Active	
**Alpha Omega Omicron**	2023	Willamette University	Salem, Oregon	Active	
**Alpha Omega Pi**	2016	Holy Family University	Philadelphia, Pennsylvania	Active	
**Alpha Omega Rho**		Fisher College	Boston, Massachusetts	Active	
**Alpha Omega Sigma**		Shenandoah University	Winchester, Virginia	Active	
**Alpha Omega Tau**		University of Hawai'i at Mānoa	Honolulu, Hawaii	Active	
**Alpha Omega Upsilon**		Midway University	Midway, Kentucky	Active	
**Alpha Omega Phi**		Brevard College	Brevard, North Carolina	Active	
**Alpha Omega Chi**		Xavier University	Cincinnati, Ohio	Active	
**Alpha Omega Chi**		California State University, Los Angeles	Los Angeles, California	Active	
**Alpha Omega Psi**		Temple University	Philadelphia, Pennsylvania	Active	
**Alpha Omega Omega**		Colgate University	Hamilton, New York	Active	
**Beta Alpha Alpha**		Alfred State College	Alfred, New York	Active	
**Beta Alpha Beta**		Regis University	Denver, Colorado	Active	
**Beta Alpha Gamma**		Webster University	St. Louis, Missouri	Active	
Beta Alpha Delta				Inactive	
Beta Alpha Epsilon				Inactive	
**Beta Alpha Zeta**		Nelson University	Waxahachie, Texas	Active	
**Beta Alpha Eta**		University of Kansas	Lawrence, Kansas	Active	
**Delta Epsilon Upsilon**	1984	University of Kentucky	Lexington, Kentucky	Active	
