= Maidan Hawalli =

Maidan Hawally ميدان حولي
- Neighbourhood/Block
- Block 11, Salmiya
- Location within Kuwait
- Coordinates: 29°20′17″N 48°02′42″E
- Country: Kuwait
- Governorate: Hawalli Governorate
- Area: Salmiya

Area
  - Total: 2.6 km^{2} (1.0 sq mi)

Population
  - Total: 200,000
  - Urban density: 76,923/km^{2} (199,230/sq mi)
- Time zone: UTC+3 (AST)

Maidan Hawally Is one of the blocks of Salmiya in Hawalli Governorate, Kuwait. The population of this block is 200,000. The district is also close to Hawally. The District is full of Mosques.

== Location ==
Maidan Hawally is known as Block 11 in Salmiya, one of the 12 blocks in Salmiya. It is bordered in the north by the Arabian Gulf road (Road 25) with the seashore. It is bordered in the northwest by 1 Street and Cairo street (Road 35) with Block 8 in Shaab. It is bordered in the west by Road 30 with Block 6 in Hawally. It is bordered in the south by The Fourth Ring road with Block 12 in Salmiya. It is bordered in the east by Amman Street with Block 9 in Salmiya.

== Landmarks ==
See Salmiya#Developments and look for places located in Block 11.

== Education ==
Maidan Hawally houses many schools, including:

- The American International School of Kuwait https://www.ais-kuwait.org/
- Al-Jameel Al-Ahlia Boys' Middle School
- The Arab Modern Academy Primary
- The Arab Modern Academy Girls' Middle
- The Arab Modern Academy Girls' Secondary
- The International Academy of Kuwait
- Hawally Girls' Middle School
- Khadijah Bint Khowailid Girls' Primary Saheen School
- An-Nasr Al-'Ahlia School
