= Gulf English School of Kuwait =

Coordinates: 29.34041°N 48.0772°E

- Salmiya, Block 5, Street 7 Kuwait

Information
- Established: 1980
- Gender: Coeducational
- Sixth form students: 32
- Houses: Secondary: Dasman Mishref; Bayan Sief; Primary: Qaruh Kubbar; Failaka Umm al Maradim
- Colours: Blue and White
- Athletics: Football, volleyball, basketball, swimming, track events
- Website: www.ges.edu.kw

Gulf English School Kuwait (GES) is a private, co-educational, international school that is currently located in the suburb of Salmiya, Kuwait. The school has a selective intake of students aged 4–18. Most teaching programmes are based on the National Curriculum of England. Year 10 and 11 within exception of fast-track year 9 students undertake programmes of study leading to GCSE and IGCSE. Sixth form students work towards Edexcel AS and A Level examinations.

GES utilizes the Accelerated Learning System, where IGCSE students complete half of their exams in Year 10, with the other half being in Year 11 (Year 9 and 10 respectively for fast-track students).

== History ==
GES opened in 1980 in Salwa and moved to Rumaithiya in 1996, then finally to Salmiya in 2005, next to Laila Gallery and Salmiya Park. The new campus is a smaller campus than the previous campus in Rumaithiya.

GES and ATIS are sister schools.

== Notable alumni ==
- Shujoun Al-Hajri, Kuwaiti actress

== Top years ==
- 2012 - 3 sports awards, school awards
- 2016 - 4 sports awards, school awards, top Kuwaiti Students.

== Awards and sports achievements ==
=== Sports ===
- AUK Boys High School Football Tournament:

2012, 2013, 2014, 2016

- AUK Girls High School Football Tournament:

2016

- Kuwait Private Schools under-15 Boys Football League:

2012

- Kuwait Private Schools Girls Primary Uni-hock Tournament:

2016

- Kuwait Primary School Handball Tournament:

2009, 2011

- Dubai's Middle-East Schools Swimming Championship:

2011

- Skepls Football Academy Tournament:

2013

- Boys U-12 uni-hock Private Schools Tournament:

2010

- Boys U-16 Football Private Schools Tournament:

2017

- ISSFK Boys Football Tournament:

2017–18

- ISSFK Girls Primary Swimming Tournament:

2019
