= Salmiya Souq =

Mall in Salmiya, Kuwait

Salmiya Souq is a mall in Salmiya, Kuwait. It was the first mall in Kuwait. It consists of CityCentre hypermarket and many other small shops and cafés.
