= Shujoun Al-Hajri =

Kuwaiti actress and broadcaster (born 1988)

Shejoun Al-Hajri
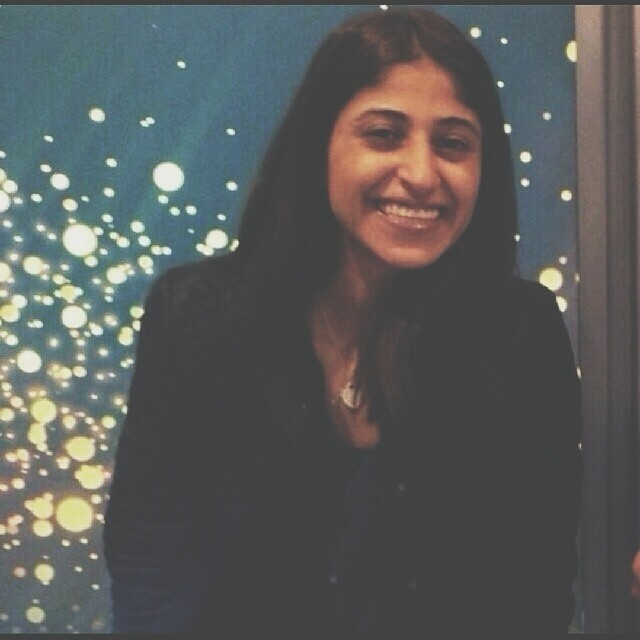
- Shejoun Al-Hajri in 2018

Background information
- Born: Shejoun matar ayth Al-Shuwayni; February 8, 1988 (age 38); Kuwait City, Kuwait
- Occupations: Actress; broadcaster; singer
- Instrument: Vocals
- Years active: 1995–present

Shejoun Al-Hajri (born February 8, 1988) is a Kuwaiti actress and broadcaster.

== Early career ==
Al-Hajri was taken in by orphanages in Kuwait until she was adopted by a Kuwaiti family later. She was raised and lived with the family for years and only learned, at the age of 13, that she was adopted. She attended Gulf English School in Kuwait.

When Al-Hajri was six, she participated in the Ramadan game show Alsoaah or Aoanh.

== Filmography ==
television roles
Year	Title	Role	Notes
1995	competitions Ramadan - Alsoaah or Aoanh	herself	
1999	Kuwaiti Stories	young girl	
1999	Youths Future	herself	
2000	The Test		
2000	Skates on Ice		
2000	South Park	translator in Arabic dub.	
2005	Adeel alrouh	Ranad	
2006	Alikhtyar alsa’aeb	herself	
2007	Jumanah	jumanah	
2007	Ers aldam	mariam	
2008	Fitha galbha abyath	Noura	
2009	mouza & Louza	Voice Actor	
2009	Alhub alkabeer	shejoun	
2009	Eni enik (2)	herself	
2009	Shouuji	herself	
2010	Shouuji 2	herself	
2010	Zwarat khamis	Mouza	
2011	Bu careem on his neak 7 women’s	jawhara	
2011	Shouuji 3	Herself	
2012	Majmoat ensan	wadha	
2012	kanat alsham wa kanain alshamia	thuraya	
2013	Ser alhawa	Dalia	
2015	Thakera mn waraq	Fajer	
2016	Sag Bambo	Noor	
2017	Black Day	Zainab	
2017	Once Upon Every Time Betrayal of August Trilogy	Rasha	
2018	Forgive Me i was Wrong	Maysam	
2018	Zone 0 (Cartoon) Ep.13	Shooji	
2018	Confrontation	Layali	

== Awards ==
- (Kuwait) Best Actress 2008
- (Kuwait) Best Show & Presenter 2009
- (Kuwait) Best TV Presenter 2010
- (Kuwait) Best GCC Artist 2015
- (Kuwait) Best lead actress Show 2016

== Personal life ==
In September 2011, Al-Hajri announced her engagement to her business manager, Ahmed Al-Buraiki, after dating for two years. In April 2013, the couple broke off their engagement after Al-Hajri learned that Al-Buraiki had another wife but they reunited together by getting married in May 2014 in Dubai. However, the couple separated for the second time in September of that year.
