= American International School of Kuwait =

The American International School of Kuwait
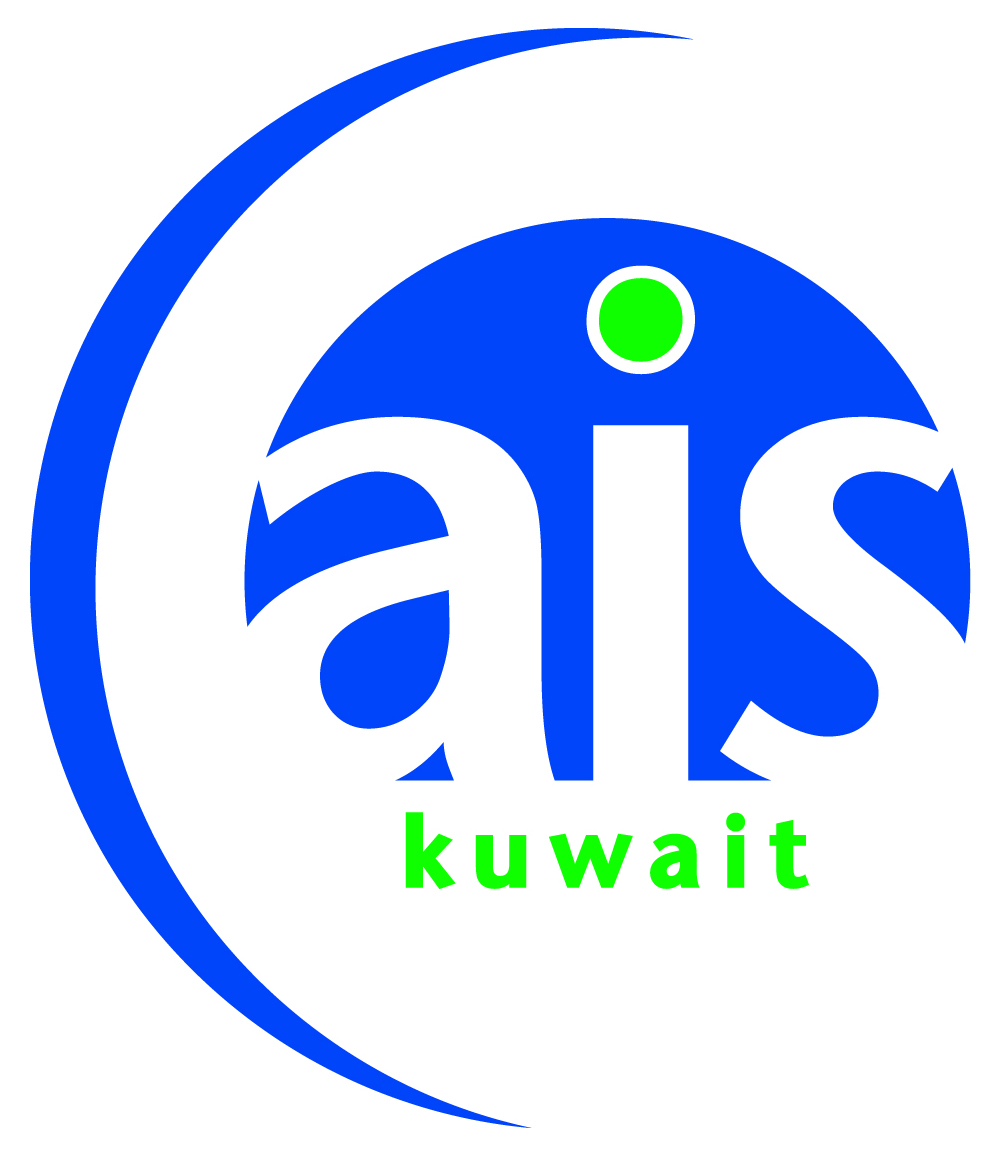
- Hawalli Governorate; Kuwait

Information
- Type: Private
- Established: 4 September 1991; 34 years ago
- Founder: Dr. Kamil Al-Rayyes
- Superintendent: Rebecca Stinson
- Early Childhood School Principal: Andria Visser
- Elementary School Principal: Brandon Rodgers
- Middle School Principal: Dana Shuhaibar
- High School Principal: Dana Shuhaibar
- Faculty: 300
- Grades: K-12
- Enrollment: approx. 3,000
- Colors: Green, blue and white
- Athletics: All major highschool athletic programs.
- Mascot: Lion
- Tuition: approx. 4000 Kuwait Dinar for elementary school and 4500 Kuwait Dinar for high school
- Website: www.ais.edu.kw

The American International School of Kuwait is a private school located in Maidan Hawalli, Kuwait, offering education from grades K to 12. The school has been a member of IBO since 1993. The school's curriculum is based mostly on the US curriculum, however religion and Arabic classes are provided due to the Ministry of Education's requirement.

== History and programs ==
The American International School of Kuwait was founded by Dr. Kamil Al-Rayyes, on September 4, 1991. It first opened in Surra with 300 students. In 1995, AIS moved to its current location in Salmiya, block 11, known as Maidan Hawalli. The school is fully accredited by the Middle States Association of Colleges and Schools.
