= Plaza College =

For-profit college in Forest Hills, New York, US

- Motto: Knowledge and Competence
- Type: Private for-profit college
- Established: 1916
- Accreditation: MSCHE
- President: Charles E. Callahan III
- Academic staff: 36 FT/ 73 PT (2023)
- Students: 846 (2023)
- Location: New York City (Forest Hills, Queens), New York, United States
- Campus: City
- Website: www.plazacollege.edu

Plaza College is a private for-profit college in Forest Hills, New York.

== History ==
Plaza College was founded in 1916. It was originally located in Long Island City, Queens and was in Jackson Heights from 1970 to 2014. The Jackson Heights facility burned to the ground on April 21, 2014 shortly before a pre-planned move to Forest Hills. Due to the fire, Plaza moved to its new campus earlier than the planned move in June 2014, instead reopening on April 30, less than two weeks after the fire.

The college offers associate degrees and bachelor's degrees as well as certificate programs in 13 fields including accounting, medical billing, and nursing. It has been accredited by the Middle States Commission on Higher Education since 1997.

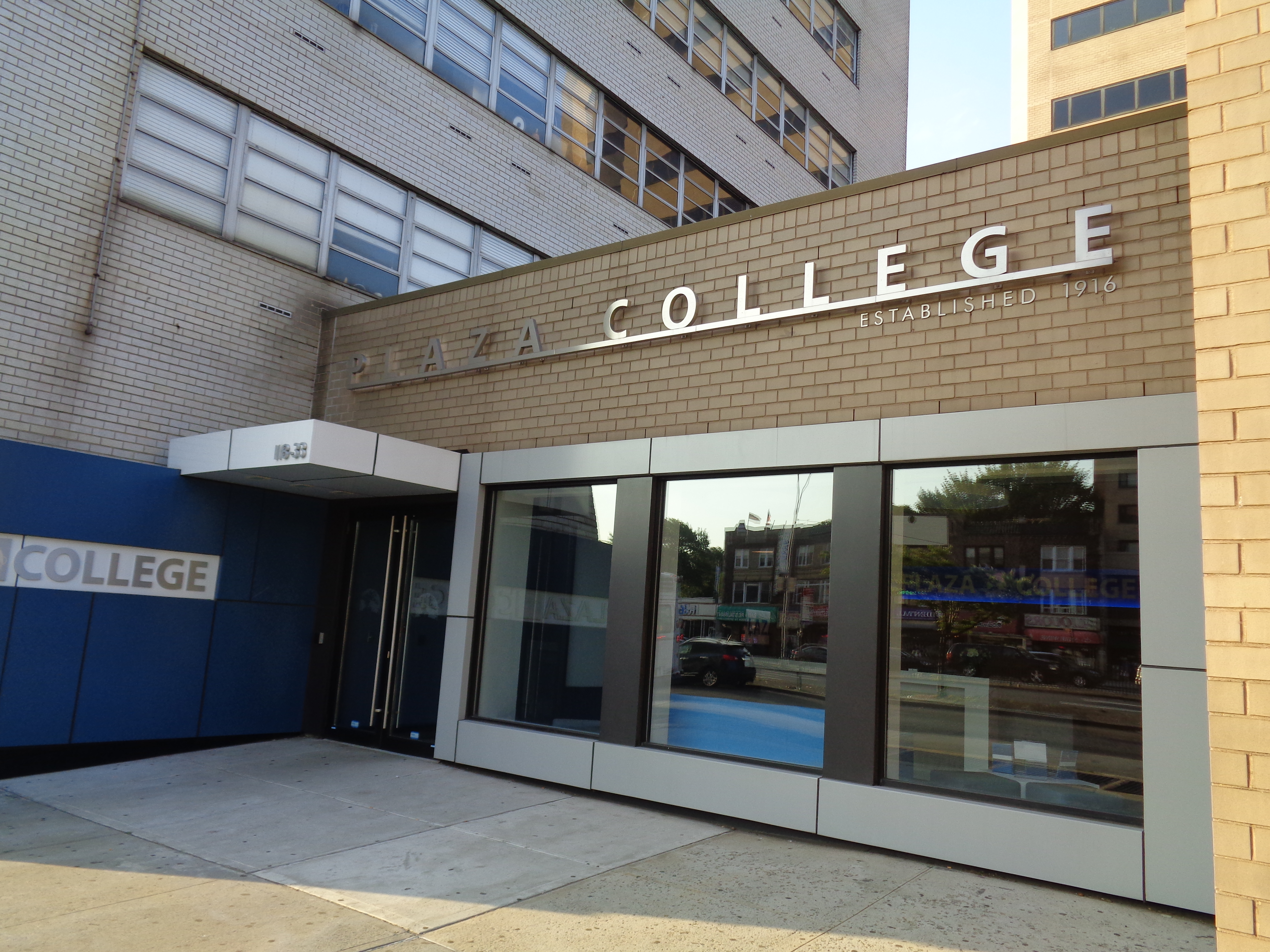
Plaza College
