= American University of Kuwait =

Private university in Salmiya, Kuwait

- الجامعة الأمريكية في الكويت
- Motto: علم فكر إرتقاء
- Motto in English: Learn • Think • Become
- Type: Private
- Established: By Amiri Decree 139 in 2003
- President: Dr. Rawda Awwad
- Undergraduates: Over 6000 graduates
- Location: Salmiya, Kuwait; 29°20′38″N 48°4′59″E
- Campus: Urban
- Colors: garnet and gold
- Mascot: Wolf Pack
- Website: www.auk.edu.kw

The American University of Kuwait (AUK) (Arabic: الجامعة الأمريكية في الكويت) is a private liberal arts institution located in Salmiya, Kuwait. Established in 2003 by Amiri decree, AUK is affiliated with Dartmouth College. The university offers both Kuwaitis and international students an education based on American stands for higher education. Since 2011, the university has had a College of Business and Economics, which in 2019 was accredited by the Association to Advance Collegiate Schools of Business (AACSB).

== Academics ==
AUK is organized into three colleges: the College of Arts and Sciences, the College of Business and Economics, and the College of Engineering and Applied Sciences. The university offers 16 undergraduate degree programs, taught in English. The College of Engineering and Applied Sciences opened in the 2019–2020 academic year and offers degrees in computer science, information systems, electrical engineering, computer engineering and systems engineering. Students who need to improve their English before entering a degree program can enroll in the Intensive English Program.

== See also ==
- AUC Press
- Cairo International Model United Nations
- American University of Sharjah (AUS)
- American University of Beirut (AUB)
- American University of Iraq - Sulaimani (AUI)
- American University in Dubai (AUD)
- List of universities in Kuwait
