= Salmiya =

Salmiya السالمية
- Area
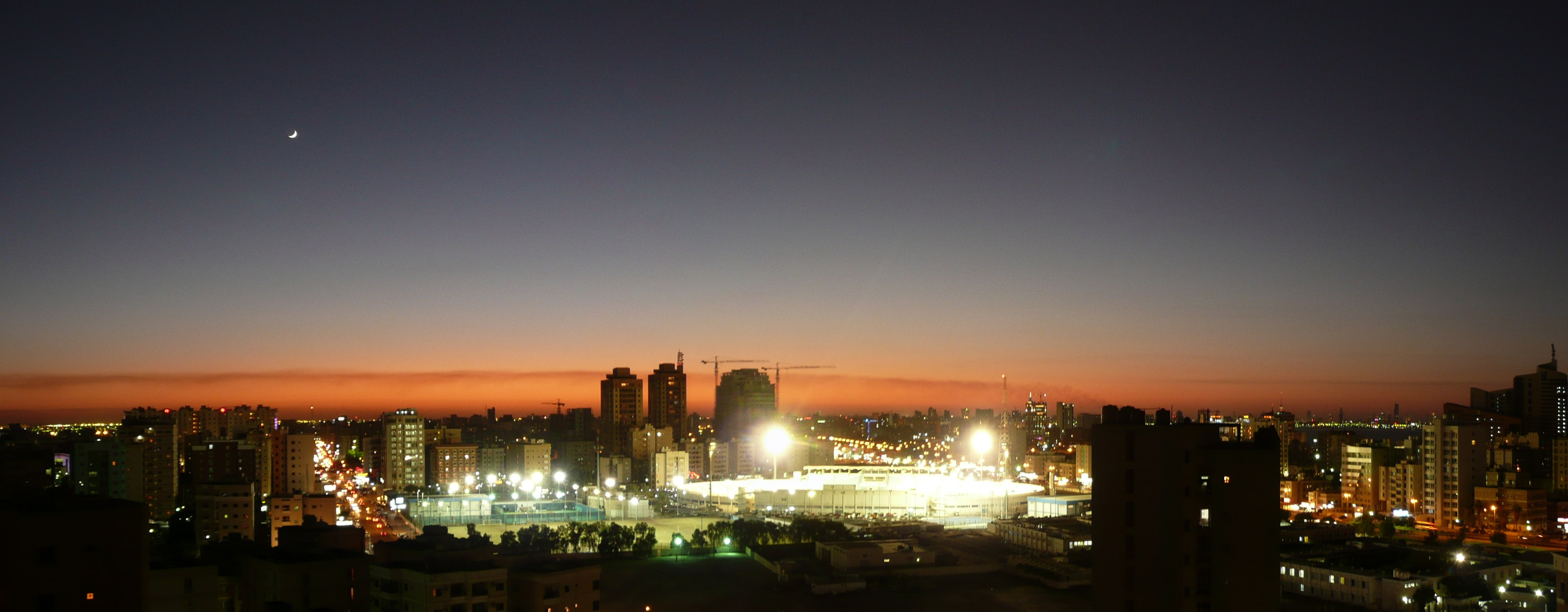
- Thamir Stadium at Night, in Salmiya

- Location within Kuwait
- Coordinates: 29°20′0″N 48°5′0″E
- Country: Kuwait
- Province: Hawalli Governorate

Government
  - Type: Municipality

Area
  - Metro: 14.2 km^{2} (5.5 sq mi)
- Elevation: 7 m (23 ft)

Population (2026)
  - Area: 331,462
- Time zone: (GMT+3)

Salmiya (Arabic: السالمية, romanized: As-Sālmīya(h)) is an area in Hawalli Governorate in Kuwait.

Salmiya is administratively divided into 12 blocks. The blocks located closer to the interior of the district tend to be mostly residential, while those located beside the Persian Gulf coastline have a large number of commercial and residential real estate. The interior residential areas boast a huge population of foreigners consisting mainly of those from the Indian sub-continent and other Arabs who are not native to the Persian Gulf area. Approximately, two-thirds of the district's population reside in blocks 8 to 12.

== Facilities ==
Salmiya hosts numerous museums, mosques, an aquarium, a Scientific Center, IMAX movie theaters, football stadium, medical centers, a Roman Catholic Chapel, the district passport office ("Jawazat") and a park beside the 5th Ring Road. Notable malls include the Salmiya Souq Mega-mall which was the first mall in the nation, Marina Mall in the Marina World shopping and entertainment district, and the Omariya mall. The Gulf Road is known for sea vistas and is the main hub for new construction of future buildings and renovations.

The Salem Al-Mubarak Street shopping district, commonly known as Salmiya Center, runs down the outer blocks of Salmiya. It is one of the oldest and largest shopping districts of Kuwait. It is a remnant of Kuwait's traditional souk bazaars, similar to the ones located in Jleeb Al-Shuyoukh and the centre Kuwait City. Well known in the past for pearls, gold and jewellery, it now consists of retail giants and local outlets. Much of the old souk had been built over, but the feel and atmosphere of the past albeit remains visible at the traditional precincts of this shopping district. The experience varies from modernized (and Westernized) in the strip malls, to a true Kuwaiti experience on some of the back streets. It is notable to point out that the more eastward away from the capital one moves along the strip, the fancier and pricier the shops are in general. There are many gold and fabric shops in the "Old Souk" area located onwards from the intersection of the 4th Ring Road and the strip.

== History ==
Salmiya has been a model district in the context of modernization. It has undertaken a major face lift in recent times primarily due to commercial real estate on the Gulf Road. The popular Salem Al-Mubarak Shopping strip is in relative close proximity to the capital. The boom in real estate in Salmiya has seen its demographics being constantly on the move.

The influx of foreigners to Salmiya is of historical importance dating as far back as the 1960s. During the Gulf War Salmiya was destroyed by invading Iraqi occupation, but from 1993 onward it was gradually rebuilt and re-populated. The old rugged 3-storied buildings and open fields, which Salmiya was famous for, have given way to high density layouts of high-rise apartments and complexes. The beach front, once a hub and harbor for the fishing and pearl diving community, has been transformed into a well-developed and modern commercial avenue. Salmiya is also one of the most expensive areas for real estate in the country.

== Sport ==
Salmiya is home to the Thamir Stadium, which belongs to Al Salmiya Club. Construction has begun on a cricket ground, which once completed will be of One Day International standard. It is hoped the facility will help develop cricket in Kuwait, as well as luring international teams to play neutral matches there. The ground is due for completion in 2012.

== Transportation ==
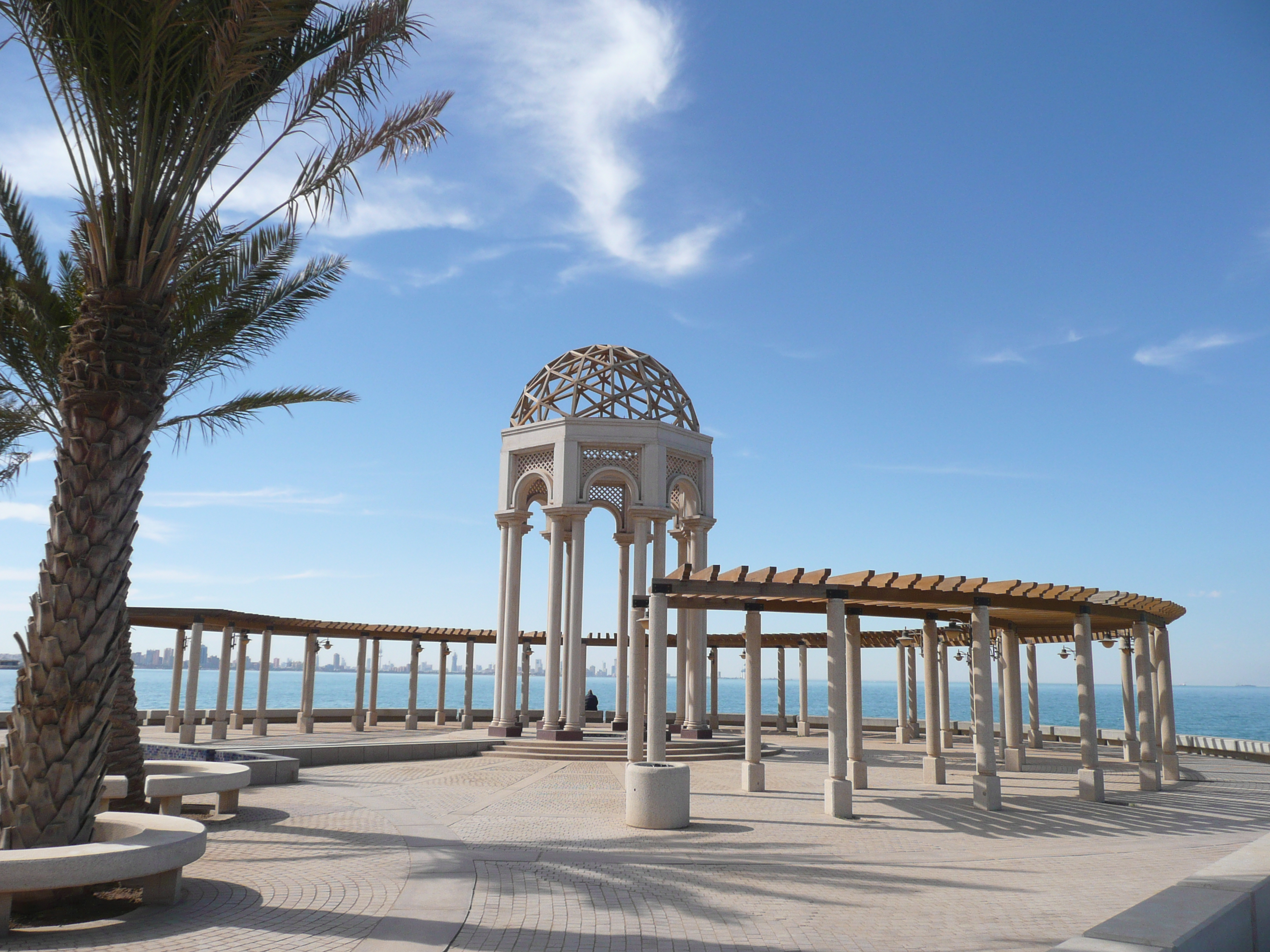
The Water front in Salmiya, Kuwait

Some of the major roads connecting Salmiya are the 4th Ring road, 5th Ring road, and the Gulf Road. There are 3 major bus operators, City Bus, Mowasalat and the Kuwait Public Transportation Company, serving all major routes along Salmiya. Taxis are widely available in Salmiya and one can expect to pre-bargain about the fare.

== Developments ==
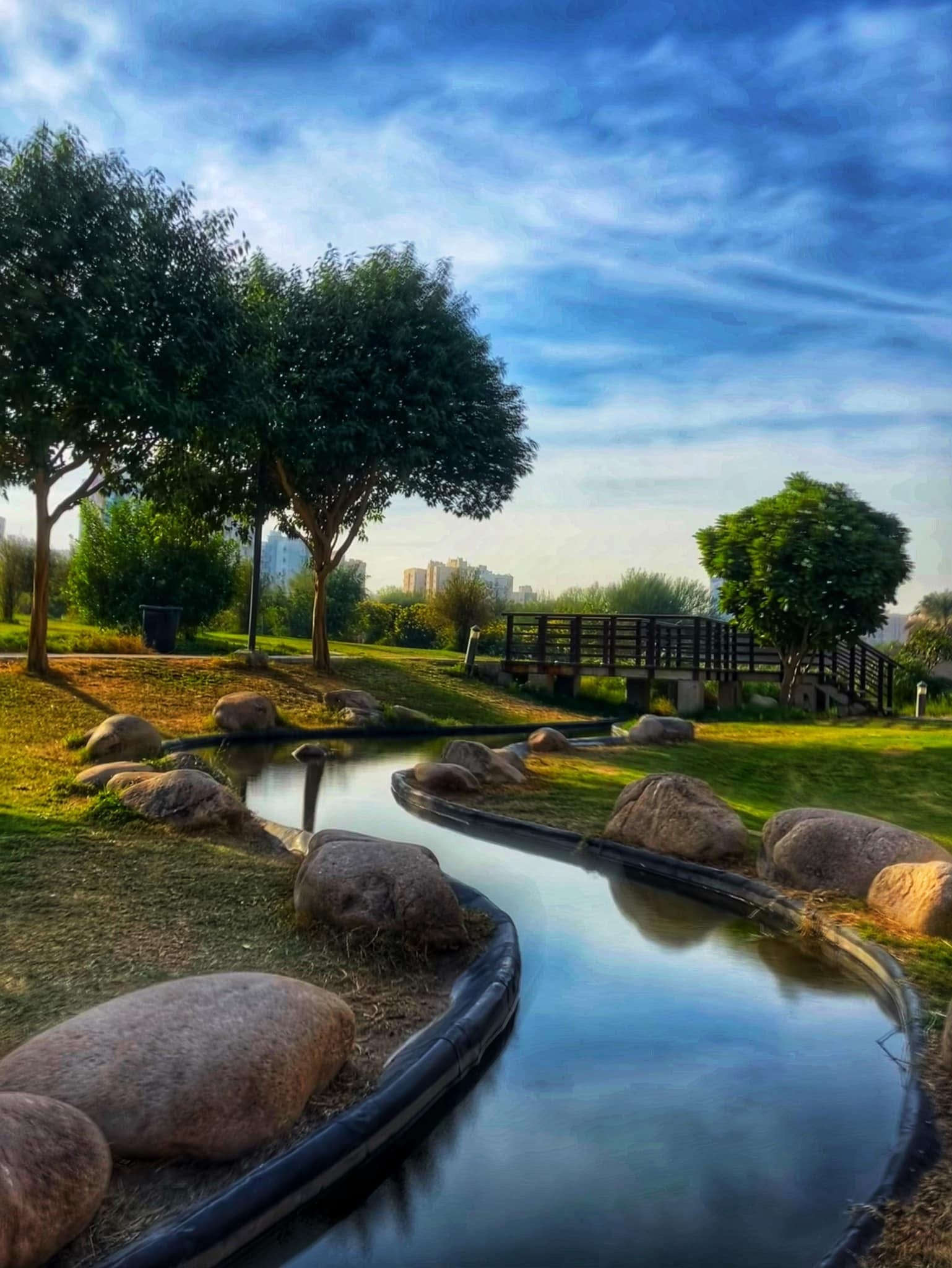
View of Boulevard Park

In 2010, Salmiya Park was proposed to a big park situated in the heart of Salmiyah. Boulevard Park is a massive park and mall in Salmiya which encompasses 353 thousand square meters including outstanding a shopping mall, restaurant village, train station & tunnel, cricket pavilion, and huge landscape including fountains, lakes, and several outdoor play grounds.

Sheikh Abdullah Al-Salem Cultural Centre includes six museums in one place inclusive of:

- Space
- Arabic & Islamic Science
- Science & Technology-Human Body
- Natural History-Ecosystems
- Science & Technology-Transportation/Robots
- Natural History-Our Earth.

== Education ==
There are several educational institutions located in Salmiya. The American University of Kuwait which is only walking-distance from the heart of Salmiya Centre. Also nearby is the Gulf English School and The French School of Kuwait. The American International School of Kuwait is also located in Salmiya. There is a large number of schools catering to different nationalities. Notably among these are the Indian, Arab, and Pakistani schools present in the area serving their respective communities. The Pakistan School and College is the oldest school in Kuwait. The Indian Community School, and Indian English Academy School (a branch of Don Bosco Schools, India) and Indian Public School are notable schools that largely cater to the Indian community in Salmiya.

S. No	Name	Address
1	American International School of Kuwait	Salmiya, Block 11
2	The English Playgroup	Salmiya, Block 7, St. 2
3	The English Primary School	Salmiya, Block 12, Abu Thur Al-Ghafari St.
4	American Creativity Academy	Salmiya, Block 12, Abu Thur Al-Ghafari St.
5	The English School	Salmiya, Block 12, Mousaed Al-Aazmi St.
6	Kuwait International English School	Salmiya, Block 12, St. 2
7	The French School of Kuwait	Salmiya, Hamad Al-Mubarak St
8	Indian Community School Kuwait	Salmiya, Block 10, Essa Al Qatami St.
9	Indian Public School	Salmiya, Amman St.
10	Indian English Academy School	Salmiya, Al Dahak bin Qays St.
11	American University of Kuwait	Salmiya, Salem Al Mubarak St.
12	Pakistan School and College	Salmiya, Block 10.
14	Salmiya Indian Model School Kuwait	Salmiya, Block 12, Al Mughera Bin Shuba Street.
15	Gulf English School of Kuwait	Salmiya, AlDimnah St.
16	[Salmiya High School of Kuwait]	Salmiya, Bahrain St.
