= Fulham =

Area in the west of London, England

Coordinates: 51.4828°N 0.1950°W

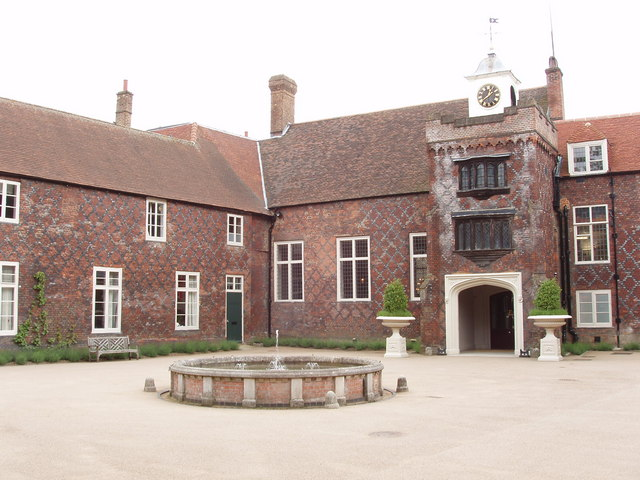
- Fulham Palace, the Grade I listed former residence of the Bishop of London

- Location within Greater London
- Population: 87,161 (2011)
- OS grid reference: TQ245765
  - Charing Cross: 3.7 mi (6.0 km) ENE
- London borough: Hammersmith & Fulham
- Ceremonial county: Greater London
- Region: London
- Country: England
- Sovereign state: United Kingdom
- Post town: LONDON
- Postcode district: SW6, W14, W6
- Dialling code: 020
- Police: Metropolitan
- Fire: London
- Ambulance: London
- UK Parliament: Chelsea and Fulham Hammersmith
- London Assembly: West Central

London Borough of Hammersmith & Fulham Ward Map, 2002-present. Fulham is the southern part of the borough.

Fulham (/ˈfʊləm/) is an area of the London Borough of Hammersmith and Fulham in West London, England, 3.7 miles (6.0 km) southwest of Charing Cross. It lies in a loop on the north bank of the River Thames, bordering Hammersmith, Kensington and Chelsea, with which it shares the area known as West Brompton. Over the Thames, Fulham faces Wandsworth, Putney, the London Wetland Centre in Barnes in the London Borough of Richmond upon Thames.

First recorded by name in 691, it was an extensive Anglo-Saxon estate, the Manor of Fulham, and then a parish. Its domain stretched from modern-day Chiswick in the west to Chelsea in the southeast; and from Harlesden in the northwest to Kensal Green in the northeast bordered by the littoral of Counter's Creek and the Manor of Kensington. It originally included today's Hammersmith. Between 1900 and 1965, it was demarcated as the Metropolitan Borough of Fulham, before its merger with the Metropolitan Borough of Hammersmith to create the London Borough of Hammersmith and Fulham (known as the London Borough of Hammersmith from 1965 to 1979). The district is split between the western and south-western postal areas.

Fulham industrial history includes pottery, tapestry-weaving, paper-making and brewing in the 17th and 18th centuries in Fulham High Street, and later the automotive industry, aviation, food production, and laundries. In the 19th century, there was glass-blowing and this resurged in the 21st century with the Aronson-Noon studio and the former Zest gallery in Rickett Street. Lillie Bridge Depot, a railway engineering depot, opened in 1872, is associated with the building and extension of the London Underground, the electrification of Tube lines from the nearby Lots Road Power Station, and for well over a century has been the maintenance hub for rolling stock and track.

Two Premier League football clubs, Fulham and Chelsea, play in Fulham. Two other notable sporting clubs are the Hurlingham Club, known for polo, and the Queen's tennis club, known for its annual pre-Wimbledon tennis tournament. In the 1800s, Lillie Bridge Grounds hosted the first meetings of the Amateur Athletic Association of England, the second FA Cup Final, and the first amateur boxing matches. The Lillie Bridge area was the home ground of the Middlesex County Cricket Club, before it moved to Marylebone.

== History ==
The word Fulham originates from Old English, with Fulla being a personal name, and hamm being land hemmed in by water or marsh, or a river-meadow. So Fulla's hemmed-in land. It is spelt Fuleham in the 1066 Domesday Book.

In recent years, there has been a great revival of interest in Fulham's earliest history, largely due to the Fulham Archaeological Rescue Group. This has carried out a number of digs, particularly in the vicinity of Fulham Palace, which show that approximately 5,000 years ago Neolithic people were living by the riverside and in other parts of the area. Excavations have also revealed Roman settlements during the third and fourth centuries AD.

=== Manor and Parish of Fulham ===
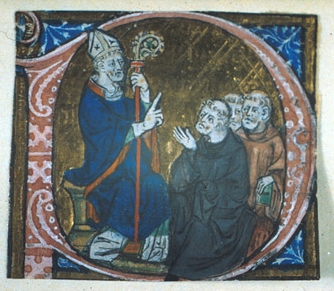
St Erkenwald, Saxon Prince, bishop and saint known as the "Light of London": granted the manor of Fulham which became the country residence of the Bishop of London for 1,000 years

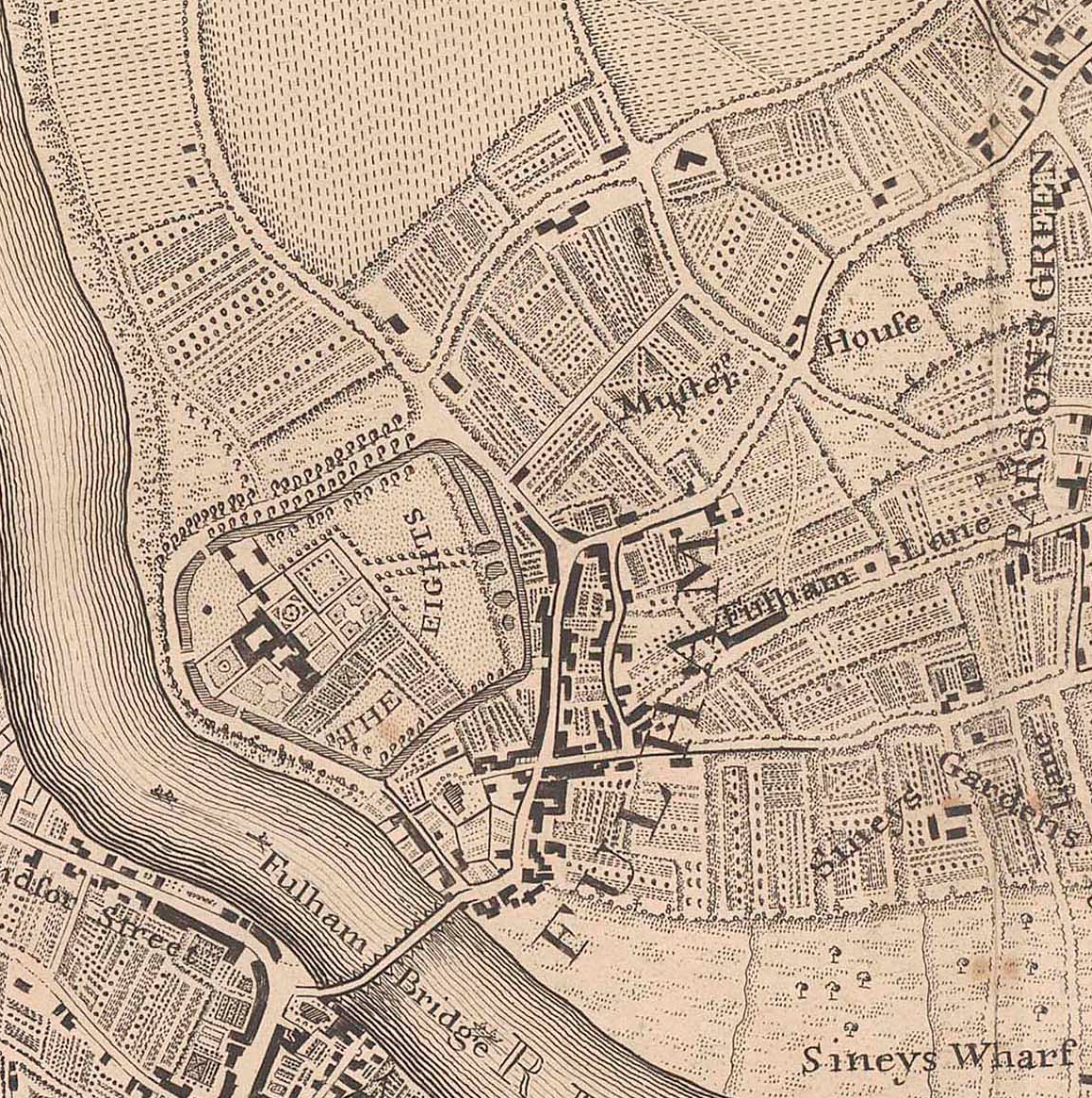
Map by John Rocque published in 1746 when apart from the village and palace the still rural nature of the surrounding area is evident. The then new "Fulham Bridge" is the precursor of Putney Bridge.

There are two not necessarily conflicting versions of how Fulham Manor came into the possession of the Bishop of London. One states the manor (landholding) of Fulham was granted to Bishop Erkenwald about the year 691 for himself and his successors as Bishop of London. The alternative has it that The Manor of Fulham was acquired by Bishop Waldhere from Bishop Tyrhtel in AD 704. In due course the manor house became Fulham Palace, and for a millennium, the country residence of the Bishops of London.

The first written record of a church in Fulham dates from 1154, with the first known parish priest of All Saints Church, Fulham appointed in 1242. All Saints Church was enlarged in 1881 by Sir Arthur Blomfield.

Hammersmith was part of the ancient parish of Fulham up until 1834. Prior to that time it had been a perpetual curacy under the parish of Fulham. By 1834 it had so many residents, a separate parish with a vicar (no longer a curate) and vestry for works was created. The two areas did not come together again until the commencement of the London Government Act in 1965.

The parish boundary with Chelsea and Kensington was formed by the now culverted Counter's Creek river, the course of which is now occupied by the West London Line. This parish boundary has been inherited by the modern boroughs of Hammersmith & Fulham and Kensington & Chelsea.

=== Early history ===
In 879 Danish invaders sailed up the Thames and wintered at Fulham and Hammersmith. Raphael Holinshed (died 1580) wrote that the Bishop of London was lodging in his manor place in 1141 when Geoffrey de Mandeville, riding out from the Tower of London, took him prisoner. During the Commonwealth the manor was temporarily out of the bishops' hands, having been sold to Colonel Edmund Harvey.

In 1642, Robert Devereux, 3rd Earl of Essex, withdrawing from the Battle of Brentford (1642), ordered to be put a bridge of boats on the Thames to unite with his detachment in Kingston in pursuit of Charles I, who ordered Prince Rupert to retreat from Brentford back west. The King and Prince moved their troops from Reading to Oxford for the winter. This is thought to have been near the first bridge (which was made of wood). It was commonly named Fulham Bridge, built in 1729 and was replaced in 1886 with Putney Bridge.

Margravine Road recalls the existence of Brandenburgh House, a riverside mansion built by Sir Nicholas Crispe in the time of Charles I, and used as the headquarters of General Fairfax in 1647 during the civil wars. In 1792 it was occupied by Charles Alexander, Margrave of Brandenburg-Ansbach and his wife, and in 1820 by Caroline, consort of George IV. His non-political 'wife' was Maria Fitzherbert who lived in East End House in Parson's Green. They are reputed to have had several children.

The extract below of John Rocque's Map of London, 1746 shows the Parish of Fulham in the loop of the Thames, with the boundary with Chelsea, Counter's Creek, narrow and dark, flowing east into the river. The recently built, wooden, first Fulham/Putney bridge is shown and two Fulham village clusters, one central, one south-west.

=== 19th century transport and power plays ===
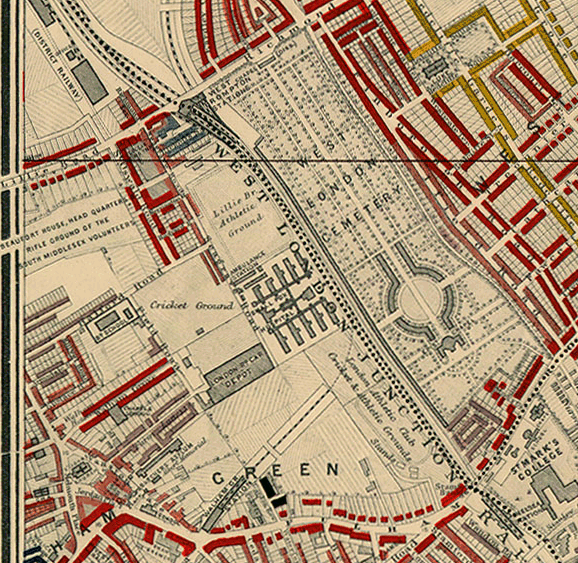
Charles Booth 1889 map - detail showing Lillie Bridge, the two railway lines and Brompton Cemetery

The 19th century roused Walham Green village, and the surrounding hamlets that made up the parish of Fulham, from their rural slumber and market gardens with the advent first of power production and then more hesitant transport development. This was accompanied by accelerating urbanisation, as in other centres in the county of Middlesex, which encouraged trade skills among the growing population.

In 1824 the Imperial Gas Light and Coke Company, the first public utility company in the world, bought the Sandford estate in Sands End to produce gas for lighting — and in the case of the Hurlingham Club, for ballooning. Its ornately decorated number 2 gasholder is Georgian, completed in 1830 and reputed to be the oldest gasholder in the World. In connection with gas property portfolios, in 1843 the newly formed Westminster Cemetery Company had trouble persuading the Equitable Gas people (a future Imperial take-over) to sell them a small portion of land to gain southern access, onto the Fulham Road, from their recently laid out Brompton Cemetery, over the parish border in Chelsea. The sale was finally achieved through the intervention of cemetery shareholder and Fulham resident, John Gunter.

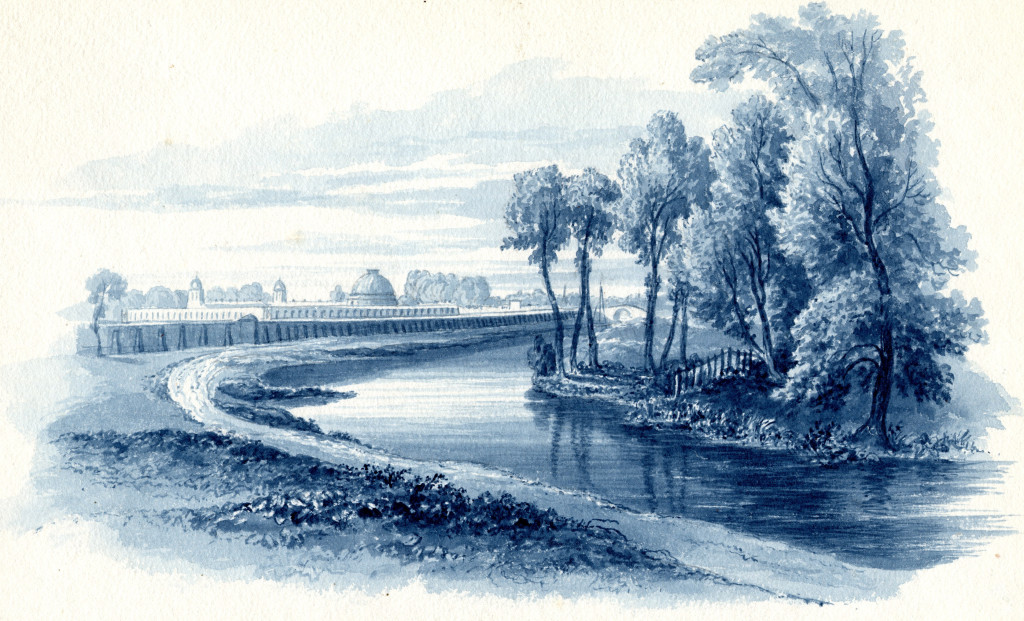
Kensington Canal and Brompton Cemetery by William Cowen, with Stamford Bridge in the distance. c. 1860

Meanwhile, another group of local landowners, led by Lord Kensington with Sir John Scott Lillie and others had conceived, in 1822, the idea of exploiting the water course up-river from Chelsea Creek on their land by turning it into a two-mile canal. It was to have a basin, a lock and wharves, to be known as the Kensington Canal, and link the Grand Union Canal with the Thames. In reality, however, the project was over budget and delayed by contractor bankruptcies and only opened in 1828, when railways were already gaining traction. The short-lived canal concept did however leave a legacy: the creation on Lillie's land of a brewery and residential development, 'Rosa', and 'Hermitage Cottages', and several roads, notably, the Lillie Road connecting the canal bridge, (Lillie Bridge) at West Brompton with North End Lane and the eventual creation of two railway lines, the West London Line and the District line connecting South London with the rest of the capital. This was done with the input of two noted consulting engineers, Robert Stephenson in 1840 and from 1860, Sir John Fowler.

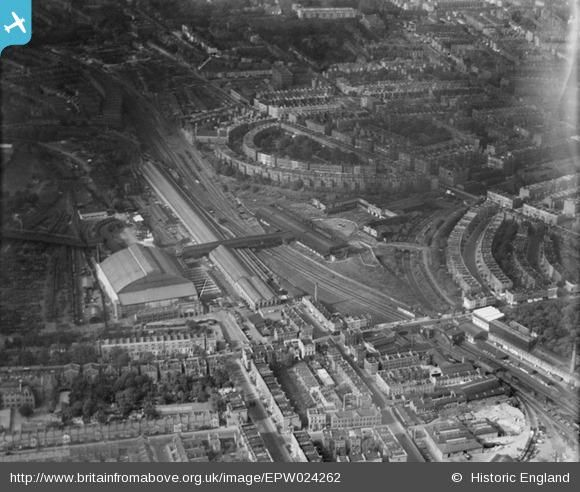
Empress Hall with Lillie Bridge Depot, Fulham, before Earl's Court Exhibition was built on the right, 1928-source: Britain from Above.

It meant that the area around Lillie Bridge was to make a lasting, if largely unsung, contribution for well over a century to the development and maintenance of public transport in London and beyond. Next to the Lillie Bridge engineering Depot, the Midland Railway established its own coal and goods yard.

In 1907 the engineering HQ of the Piccadilly Line in Richmond Place (16-18 Empress Place) oversaw the westward expansion of the line into the suburbs. At the turn of the century, the London Omnibus Co in Seagrave Road oversaw the transition of horse-drawn to motor buses, which were eventually integrated into London Transport and London Buses. This attracted a host of other automotive enterprises to move into the area.

With the growth of 19th-century transport links into East Fulham and its sporting venues by 'Lillie Bridge', along with the immediately neighbouring 24-acre Earl's Court exhibition grounds, and the vast the Empress Hall (see entertainment section below). During the First World War it would become accommodation for Belgian refugees. Meanwhile, the historic hamlet of North End was massively redeveloped in the 1880s by Messrs Gibbs & Flew, who built 1,200 houses on the fields. They had trouble disposing of the properties, so for public relations purposes, they renamed the area 'West Kensington', to refer to the more prosperous neighbourhood over the parish boundary.

The last farm to function in Fulham was Crabtree Farm, which closed at the beginning of the 20th century. A principal recorder of all these changes was a local man, Charles James Féret (1854-1921), who conducted research over a period of decades before publishing his three volume history of Fulham in 1900.

=== Art and craft ===
Ceramics and weaving in Fulham go back to at least the 17th century, most notably with the Fulham Pottery, followed by the establishment of tapestry and carpet production with a branch of the French 'Gobelins manufactory' and then the short-lived Parisot weaving school venture in the 1750s. William De Morgan, ceramicist and novelist, moved into Sands End with his painter wife, Evelyn De Morgan, where they lived and worked. Another artist couple, also members of the Arts and Crafts movement, lived at 'the Grange' in North End, Georgiana Burne-Jones and her husband, Edward Burne-Jones, both couples were friends of William Morris.

Other artists who settled along the Lillie Road, were Francesco Bartolozzi, a florentine engraver and Benjamin Rawlinson Faulkner, a society portrait painter. Henri Gaudier-Brzeska, the French expressionist painter and friend of Ezra Pound, lived in Walham Green till his early death in 1915. Glass production was, until recently, represented by the stained glass studio of the purpose-built and Grade II listed Glass House in Lettice Street and latterly, by the Aaronson Noon Studio, with the 'Zest' Gallery in Rickett Street, that was obliged to shut down in 2012, after 20 years by the developers of 'Lillie Square' and Earl's Court. Both glass businesses have now moved out of London.

The Art Bronze Foundry, founded by Charles Gaskin in 1922 operated in Michael Road, off the New King's Road, a short distance from Eel Brook Common until it gave way to an apartment redevelopment in 2017. It had produced works by Henry Moore, Elisabeth Frink, Barbara Hepworth and Jacob Epstein among others. Its work may be seen in public spaces all over the world.

=== 20th century ===
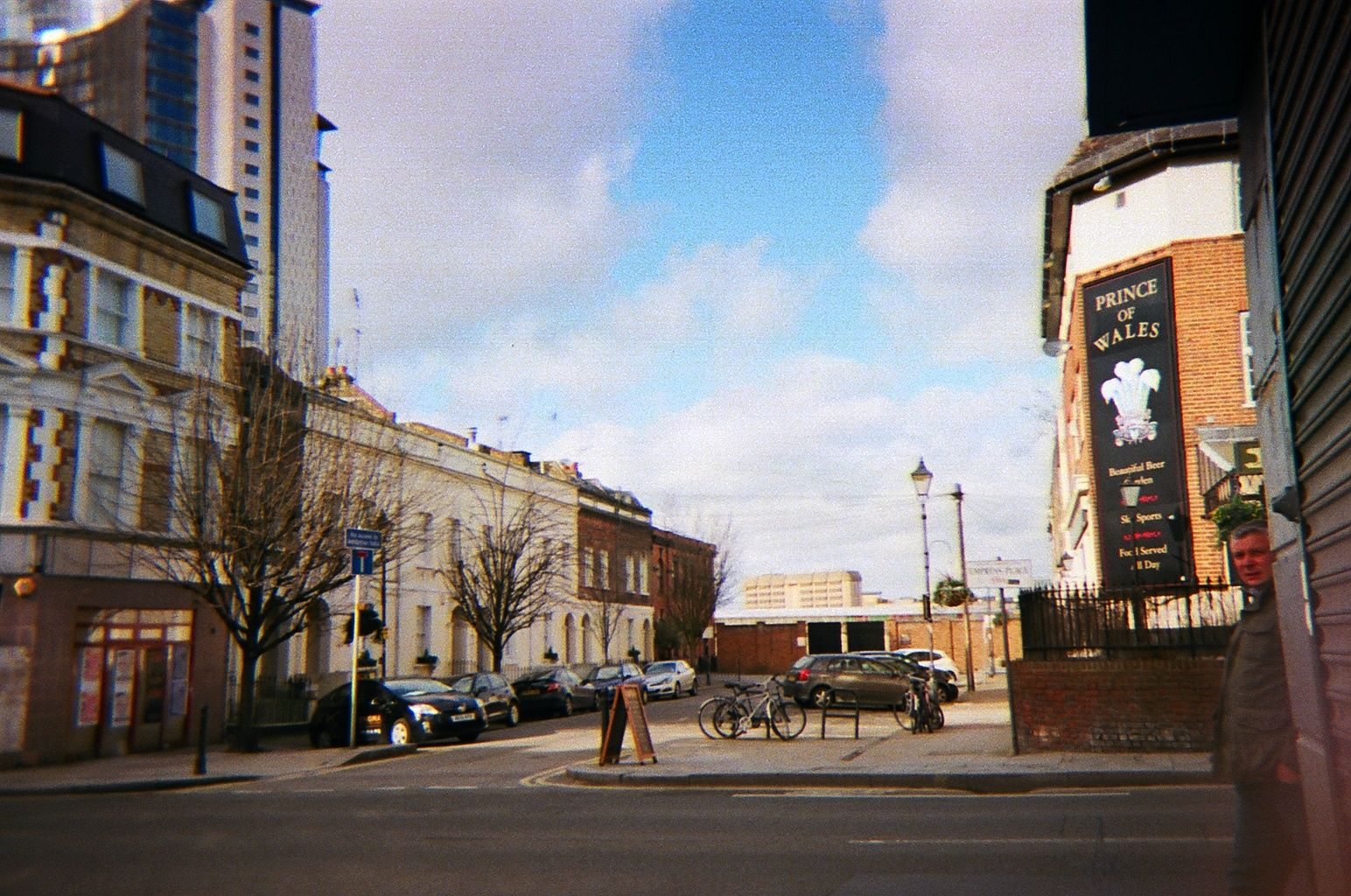
Empress Place (1865), with the former Piccadilly line HQ, last block on the left of street

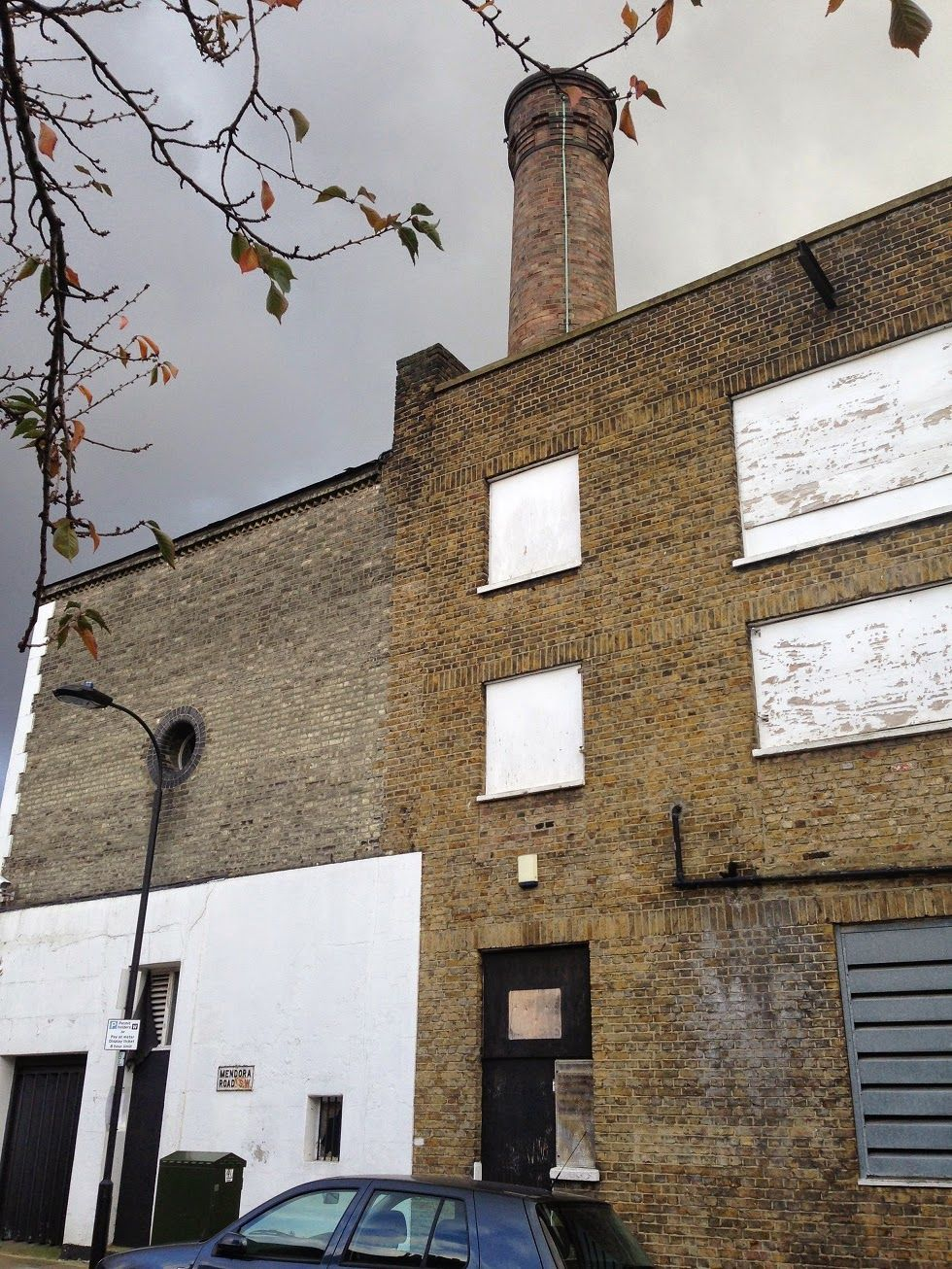
Chimney stack on the old laundry and Kodak lab. site in Rylston Road, Fulham

In 1926, the Church of England established the office of Bishop of Fulham as a suffragan to the Bishop of London.

Fulham remained a predominantly working-class area for the first half of the 20th century, with genteel pockets at North End, along the top of Lillie and New King's roads, especially around Parsons Green, Eel Brook Common, South Park and the area surrounding the Hurlingham Club. Essentially, the area had attracted waves of immigrants from the countryside to service industrialisation and the more privileged parts of the capital. With rapid demographic changes there was poverty, as noted by Charles Dickens (1812-1870) and Charles Booth (1840-1916). Fulham had its poorhouses, and attracted several benefactors, including: the Samuel Lewis (financier) Housing Trust, the Peabody Trust and the Sir Oswald Stoll Foundation to provide low-cost housing.

The Metropolitan Asylums Board acquired in 1876 a 13-acre site at the bottom of Seagrave Road to build a fever hospital, The Western Hospital, that later became an NHS centre of excellence for treating polio until its closure in 1979. Bar one ward block remaining in private occupation, it was replaced by a gated-flats development and a small public space, Brompton Park.

Aside from the centuries-old brewing industry, exemplified by the Swan Brewery on the Thames, the main industrial activities involved motoring and early aviation — Rolls-Royce, Shell-Mex & BP, Rover, the London General Omnibus Company — and rail engineering (Lillie Bridge Depot), laundries — the Palace Laundry is still extant — and the building trades. Later there developed distilling, Sir Robert Burnett's White Satin Gin, food processing, e.g. Telfer's Pies, Encafood and Spaghetti House, and Kodak's photographic processing. This encouraged the southern stretch of North End Road to become Fulham's unofficial "High street", almost a mile from the actual Fulham High Street, with its own department store, F.H. Barbers, along with Woolworths, Marks & Spencer and Sainsbury's outlets, all long gone. The second ever Tesco shop opened in the North End Road. The UK's reputedly oldest independent health-food shop, opened in 1966 by the Aetherius Society, still trades on Fulham Road.

Allied to these developments, the postwar period saw the extensive demolition of Fulham's early 19th-century architectural stock, replaced by some Brutalist architecture — the current Ibis hotel — and the Empress State Building in Lillie Road that in 1962 replaced the declining Empress Hall. The London County Council and local council continued with much-needed council-housing development between World War II and up to the 1980s.

Fulham has undergone significant gentrification since the late 20th century, when professionals and families—drawn by its Victorian housing and riverside setting—began arriving. This early wave of change gained momentum through the 1990s, and by the 2000s Fulham had firmly established itself as one of London’s most desirable Zone 2 neighbourhoods, combining a village‑like character with upgraded housing stock, affluent amenities, and well‑regarded schools.

=== Piece of aviation history ===
Geoffrey de Havilland, aviation pioneer, built his first aeroplane at his workshop in Bothwell Street, Fulham in 1909. Later, during the First World War, Cannon's Brewery site at the corner of Lillie and North End Road was used for aircraft manufacture. The Darracq Motor Engineering Company of Townmead Road, became aircraft manufacturers in Fulham for the Airco company, producing De Havilland designs and components for the duration of the war.

=== Musical heritage ===
William Crathern, the composer, was organist at St Mary's Church, West Kensington, when it was still known as North End. Edward Elgar, the composer, lived at 51 Avonmore Road, W14, between 1890 and 1891. The notorious Italian tenor Giovanni Matteo Mario de Candia and his wife opera singer Giulia Grisi, made Fulham their home from 1852 until the 1900s at a lovely country-manor where their daughters and son were born, among them writer Cecilia Maria de Candia. Conductor and composer Hyam Greenbaum married the harpist Sidonie Goossens on 26 April 1924 at Kensington Registry Office and they set up home in a first floor flat on the Fulham Road, opposite Michelin House.

=== Redevelopment ===
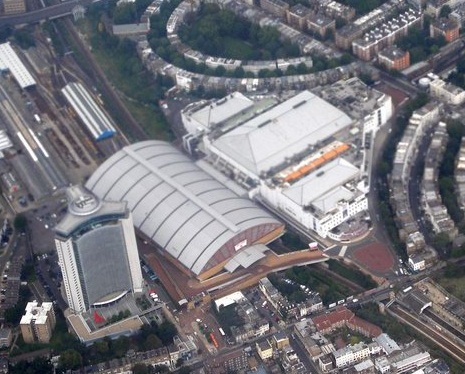
Aerial view of Earl's Court, 2008 L-R Empress State Building, Earl's Court Two in H&F and Earl's Court One in RBKC

With the accession of Boris Johnson to the mayoralty of London, a controversial 80 acre high-rise redevelopment has been under way on the eastern borough boundary with the Royal Borough of Kensington and Chelsea, involving the dismantling of the two Earl's Court Exhibition Centres in RBKC and in Hammersmith and Fulham and the emptying and demolition of hundreds of commercial properties, thousands of both private and social housing units and including the demolition of a rare example in Fulham of mid-Victorian housing, designed by John Young, close to Grade I and II listed structures and to a number of conservation areas in both boroughs. It also involves the closure of the historic Lillie Bridge Depot, opened in 1872 and the dispersal of its operations by TfL

== Politics ==
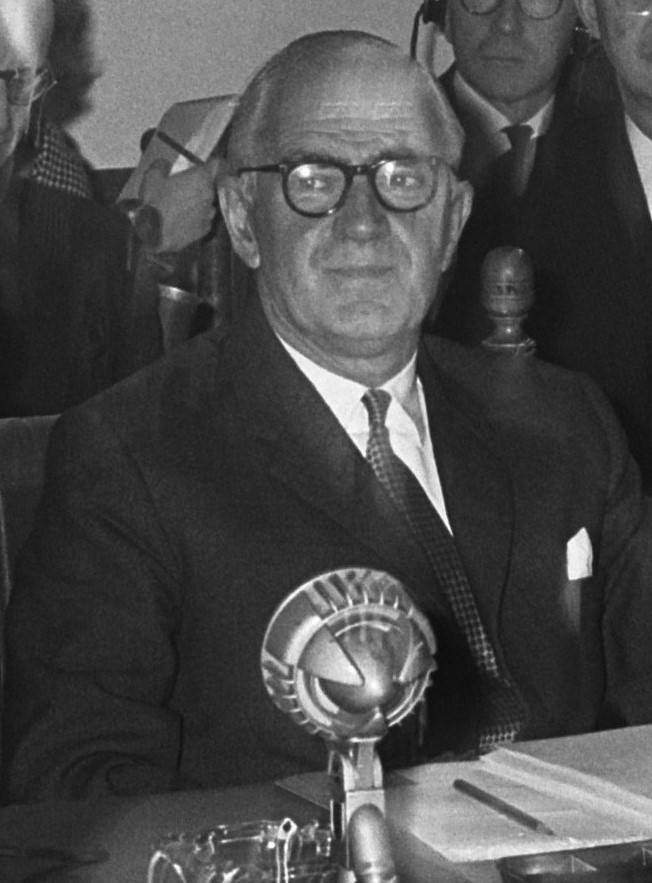
Michael Stewart, Baron Stewart of Fulham

Fulham is part of two constituencies: one, Hammersmith bounded by the north side of the Lillie Road, is represented by Andy Slaughter for Labour, the other, Chelsea and Fulham parliamentary seat is currently held by Ben Coleman for the Labour since 2024. It had been held by Greg Hands and the Conservatives for many years before this. Fulham was formerly a part of the Hammersmith and Fulham parliamentary constituency which was dissolved in 2010 to form the current seats. However, parts of Fulham continue to score highly on the Jarman Index, indicating poor health outcomes due to adverse socio-economic factors.

Fulham has in the past been solid Labour territory. Michael Stewart, one time Foreign Secretary in the Wilson government, was its long-standing MP, from 1945 until he stood down in 1979. It became a politically significant part of the country, having been the scene of two major parliamentary by-elections in the 20th century. In 1933, the Fulham East by-election became known as the "peace by-election". The 1986 by-election following the death of Conservative MP, Martin Stevens, resulted in a Labour win for Nick Raynsford on a 10% swing.

With "gentrification", Fulham voters have been leaning towards the Conservatives since the 1980s as the area underwent huge demographic change: the tightly packed terraces which had housed working-class families employed in trade, engineering and the industry that dominated Fulham's riverside being gradually replaced with young professionals.

In the 2005 General Election, Greg Hands won the Hammersmith and Fulham Parliamentary seat for the Conservatives, polling 45.4% against Labour's 35.2%, a 7.3% swing. In the 2010 General Election, he was re-elected this time for the newly formed Chelsea and Fulham constituency. In the 2015 General Election he was returned with an increased share of the vote. In the 2024 General Election Ben Coleman defeated Greg Hands by 151 votes to retake the seat for the Labour Party.

Hammersmith and Fulham is currently controlled by Labour. At the 2014 local elections, Labour won 11 seats from the Conservatives, giving them 26 councillors and control of the council (said to have been the then Prime Minister David Cameron's "favourite") for the first time since 2006.

== Sport, entertainment and life-style ==
=== Sport ===
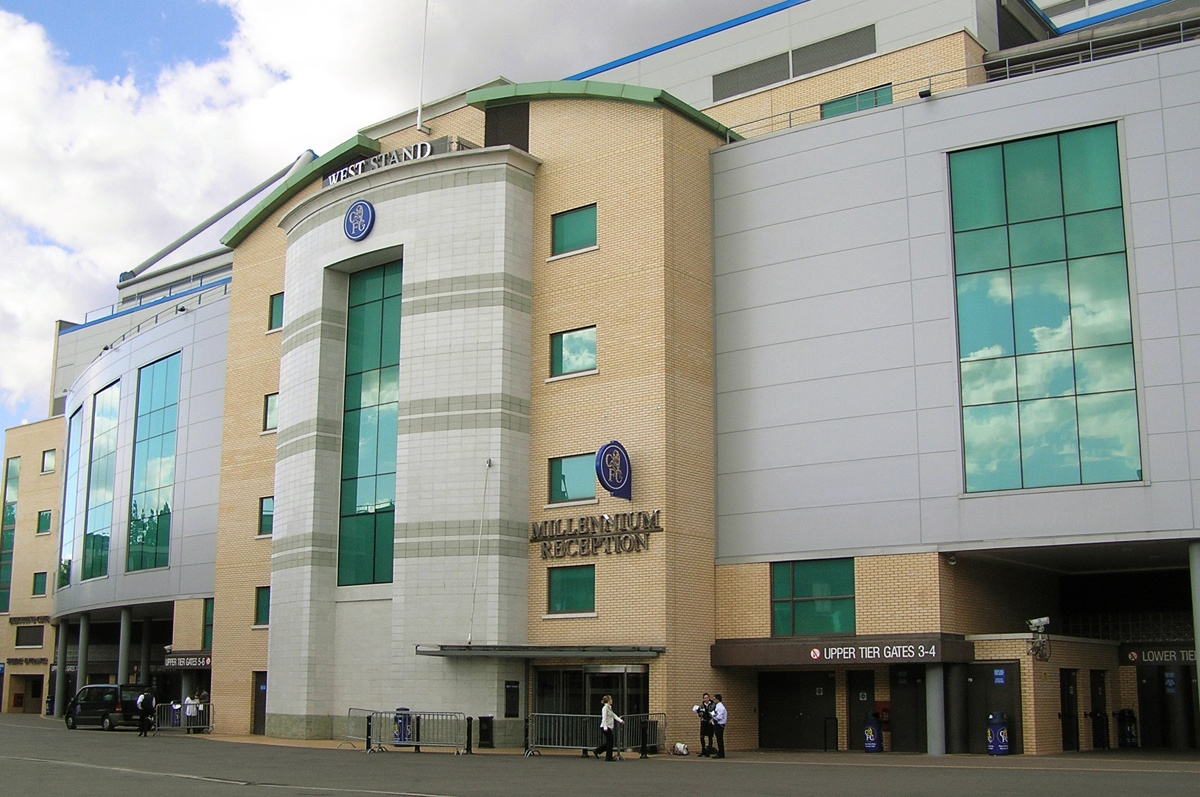
Stamford Bridge, home of Chelsea FC

The first organised sporting activity in Fulham took place at the Lillie Bridge Grounds in the 1860s when British Amateur Athletics were introduced and the first codified Boxing under Marquess of Queensberry Rules matches were staged. The catalyst for sport in Fulham was the Cambridge rowing blue and sports administrator, Welshman John Graham Chambers. Later, with the destruction of the Lillie Bridge Grounds by a riot in 1889, they were replaced first by the Fulham F.C. stadium Craven Cottage and the Chelsea F.C. stadium at Stamford Bridge. Other sports facilities were opened at The Queen's Club for rackets and tennis and at the private members' Hurlingham Club, for a range of sporting activities in the south of the borough. Hurlingham Park's tennis courts are used as netball courts and tennis nets are taken down and so restricting access to the courts for tennis. Hurlingham Park hosts the annual Polo in the Park tournament, which has become a recent feature of the area. The Hurlingham club is the historic home of polo in the United Kingdom and of the world governing body of polo.

Public tennis courts are located in Bishops Avenue, off Fulham Palace Road and on Eel Brook Common. Rugby is played on Eel Brook Common and in South Park. Normand Park in Lillie Road is the entry into the Virgin Active-operated Fulham Pools swimming facilities and neighbouring tennis courts.

Fulham has five active Bowls clubs: The Bishops Park Bowls club, The Hurlingham Park Bowls Club, Normand Park Bowls Club, The Parson's Green Bowls club and The Winnington in Bishops Park.

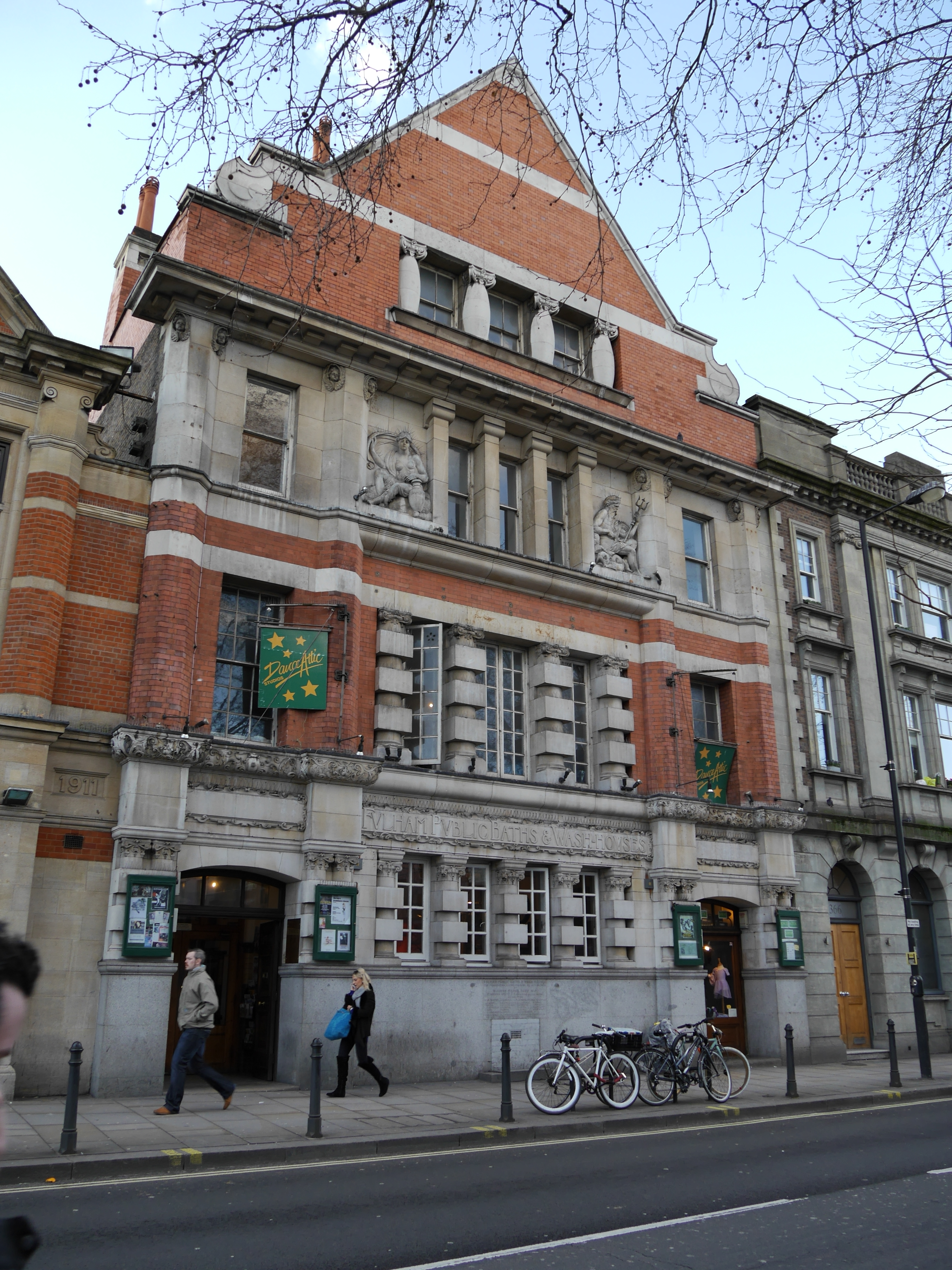
Fulham Baths

=== Entertainment ===
The historic entertainment destinations in Fulham, have included Earl's Court Pleasure Gardens, the brain-child of John Robinson Whitley, straddling the border with Kensington since 1879, then the 1894 Great Wheel and the 6,000-seater Empress Hall, built in 1894 at the instigation of international impresario, Imre Kiralfy — the scene of his spectacular shows and later sporting events and famous ice shows — and latterly, Earl's Court II, part of the Earl's Court Exhibition Centre in the neighbouring, Royal Borough of Kensington and Chelsea. The first closed in 1959, replaced by an office block, the Empress State Building. The second, opened by Princess Diana, lasted just over 20 years until 2014. Along with the architecturally pleasing Mid-Victorian Empress Place, formerly access to the exhibition centre, it is destined for high rise re-development, but with usage as yet to be confirmed.

No trace is left today of either of Fulham's two theatres, both opened in 1897. The 'Grand Theatre' was on the approach to Putney Bridge and was designed by the prolific WGR Sprague, author of venues such as Wyndham's Theatre and the Aldwych Theatre in London's West End. It gave way to office blocks in the late 1950s. The 'Granville Theatre', founded by Dan Leno, to the design of Frank Matcham, once graced a triangle of land at Walham Green. After the Music hall era had passed, It served as a film and television studio, but was finally demolished in 1971. It too has been replaced by an office block in Fulham Broadway.

The performing arts continue in Fulham, like the notable Fulham Symphony Orchestra and the successful Fulham Opera. St John's Parish Church, at the top of North End Road, stages choral and instrumental concerts as do other churches in the area.

There is a cinema complex as part of the Fulham Broadway Centre. Fulham Town Hall, built in 1888 in the classical renaissance, was used as a popular venue for concerts and dances, especially its Grand Hall. Behind Fulham Broadway, the heart of the original village of Walham Green has undergone pedestrianisation, including the spot once occupied by the village green and its pond next to St. John's Parish Church and bordered by a number of cafés, bars, and a dance studio in the old Fulham Public Baths. The largest extant supermarket in Fulham, is located on the site of a cinema later converted to the iconic "Dicky Dirts" jean store with its sloping shop-floor, at the top of North End Road's Street market. It started a new trend in how retail was done.

The debut albums by 1970s new wave bands The Stranglers (Rattus Norvegicus) and Generation X (Generation X) were recorded at TW Studios, 211 Fulham Palace Road. The Greyhound music venue at 176 Fulham Palace Road hosted up and coming punk, post-punk and indie bands in the late 1970s and the 1980s. Film music creator, Hans Zimmer double Oscar winner, launched his career in a studio behind the Lillie Langtry public house in Lillie Road in the 1970s.

=== Gin, breweries and pubs ===
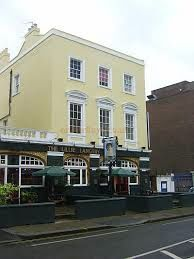
Lillie Langtry pub (formerly, 'The Lillie Arms'), 1835

The most illustrious brewery in Fulham was the Swan Brewery, Walham Green, dating back to the 17th century. Among its patrons were kings and other royalty. It was followed by the North End Brewery in 1832, Cannons again in North End in 1867 and finally on account of temperance, the alcohol-free phenomenon that was Kops Brewery founded in 1890 at a site in Sands End. In 1917 Kops Brewery closed and was converted into a margarine factory.

Gin distilling came to the remnants of the North End Brewery in Seagrave Road after a brief period of service as a timber works in the 1870s and lasted for almost a century. The premises were taken over by distillers Vickers who at the outbreak of the First World War sold out to Burnett's, producers of White Satin Gin, until a 1970s take-over by a Kentucky liquor business. None of the breweries remains.

With its long history of brewing, Fulham still has a number of pubs and gastropubs. The oldest tavern is the Lillie Langtry in Lillie Road, originally the Lillie Arms named after its first freeholder, Sir John Scott Lillie, who built it in 1835 as part of the 'North End Brewery' complex, run from 1832 to 1833 by a Miss Goslin. It was intended originally to service the Kensington Canal workers and bargees. Later, it was the watering hole of the new railway builders, motor and omnibus company staff and latterly Earl's Court exhibition and Chelsea F.C. visitors. Of the three popular neighbouring pubs acquired by developers during 2014–15, the Imperial Arms and the Prince of Wales were forced to shut; only the Atlas, reconstructed after bomb damage in the Second World War, has been reprieved.

The White Horse in Parsons Green is colloquially known by many as the "Sloaney Pony", a reference to the "Sloane Rangers" who frequent it. Pubs which are Grade II listed buildings include the Duke on the Green and Aragon House both facing Parsons Green, the Cock in North End Road, and the Temperance in Fulham High Street. Other pubs include the Durrell in Fulham Road, the locally and Michelin Guide listed 1866 Harwood Arms in Walham Grove and the Mitre on Bishops Road.

=== Open space ===
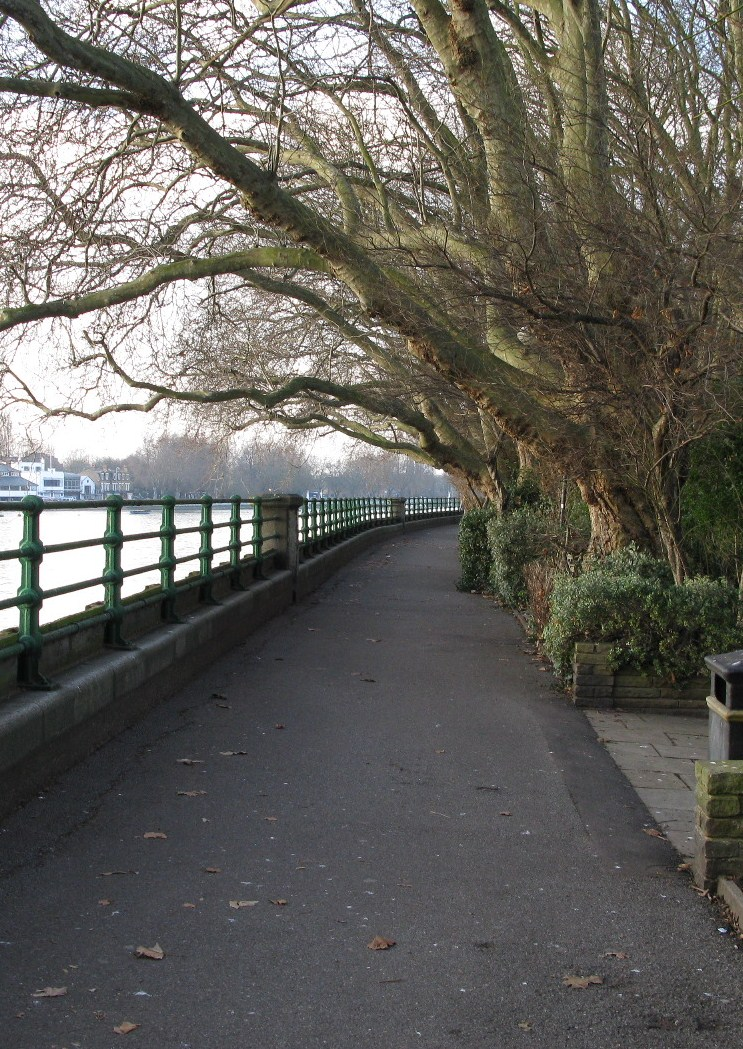
Bishop's Park

Fulham has several parks, cemeteries and open spaces, of which Bishop's Park, Fulham Palace Gardens, Hurlingham Park, South Park, Eel Brook Common and Parsons Green are the largest.

Among the other spaces are Normand Park, the vestige of a convent garden with a bowling green, Lillie Road Recreation Ground with its gym facility and Brompton Park in Seagrave Road. The Thames riverside walk in Bishop's Park was historically interrupted by the Fulham football ground, but with the completion of the Fulham Pier extension it is now continuous as part of the Thames Path, continuing past the neighbouring flats, the Crabtree pub and The River Cafe (London) towards Hammersmith Bridge, affording views of the river and rural scenes on the opposite bank.

== Heritage ==
=== Architectural ===
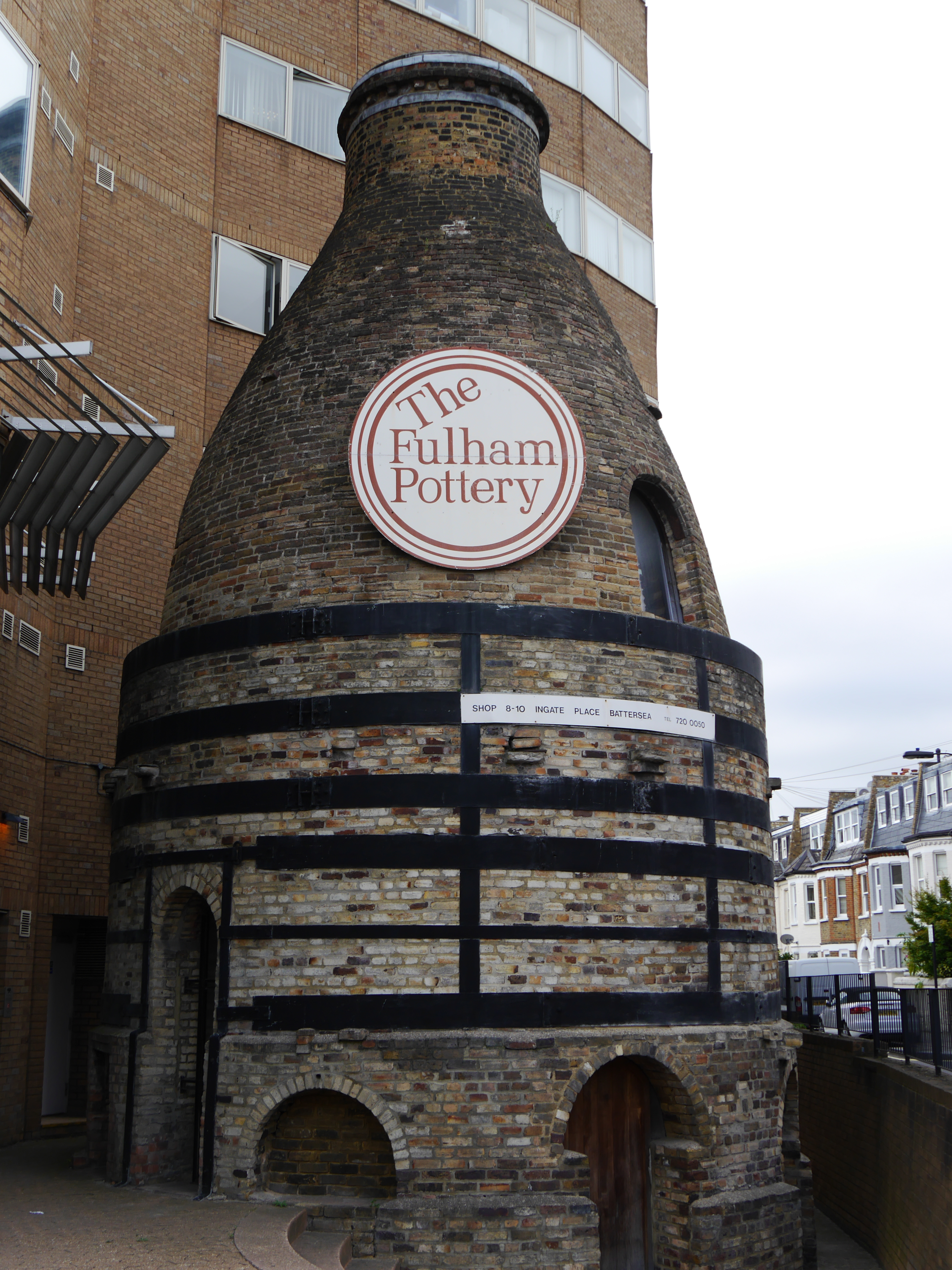
Sole remnant of Fulham Pottery, one kiln

Fulham parish's rural past meant that its grand houses and not so grand vernacular and industrial buildings were either clustered in the village of Walham Green, along the Thames or scattered among the fields of the hamlet of North End. Many historic structures fell prey to industrialisation, war-time bombing or a rush to demolition and redevelopment. Gone are Burne-Jones's 'Grange' in W14 and Foote's 'Hermitage' villa and park as is Lovibond's Cannon Brewery in SW6.

The ancient buildings and estate of Fulham Palace, the seat of the Bishops of London until 1973, remains the outstanding asset with its Grade I listed medieval and Tudor buildings including a small museum, 13 acres of grounds, walled garden, and the part-excavated longest moat in England. The gardens are Grade II* listed. The further original grounds are now divided between a park by the riverside, All Saints’ Primary School and The Moat School, and public allotments.

Church Gate to the south of Fulham Palace, is the approach to All Saints Church, with its 14-15th-c. tower and 18th-c. tombs in the churchyard including those of a number of the Bishops of London. The Roman Catholic Relief Act 1791 led to a gradual reintroduction of Catholic worship in the parish, but not until 1847 was the foundation stone laid for a church. This was St Thomas of Canterbury Church, Fulham, with its presbytery, churchyard and school, off Crown Lane, designed in Gothic Revival style by Augustus Pugin. It is his only complete church and associated buildings in London and is Grade II* listed.

There are a number of other statutorily and locally listed structures strewn across Fulham. Worthy of note is the last remaining conical kiln of the Fulham Pottery. Broomhouse Lane has a number of structures of interest, ranging from the Broomhouse draw-dock of medieval origin to 18th-c. cottages (Sycamore and Ivy) and the Gothic revival Castle Club. The Vineyard in Hurlingham Road is of 17th-c. origin with later 19th-c. additions such as the stable buildings. The Hurlingham Club and grounds are of 18th-c. origin and Grade II* listed. The winding North End Road had several buildings of note. What remains are 'Crowthers' at no. 282, first built in 1712 with its extant 18th-c. gate-piers and the modernist (1938) Seven Stars public house, acquired by developers in 2014 and now converted into flats.

The New King's Road contains several 18th-c. and early 19th-c. residences, namely, Northumberland House, Claybrook House, Jasmine House, Belgrave House, Aragon House, and 237–245 New King's Road, all Grade II listed.

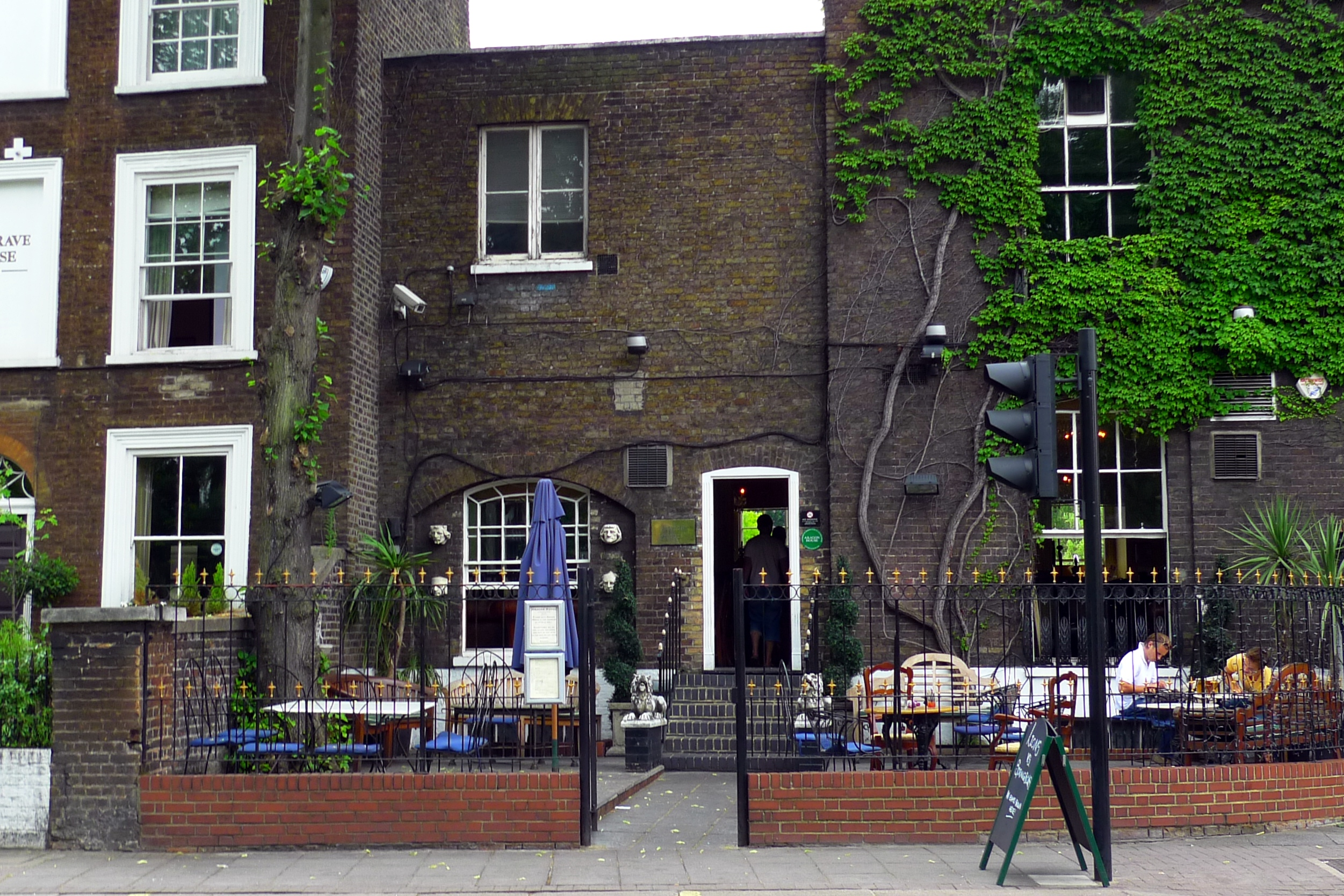
Aragon House, Parsons Green, SW6

Much of the stock in Fulham attests its vigorous 19th-c. industrial and urban development, most of it, 'low-rise', and benefiting from the brick-fields that abounded locally at the time. An unlisted vestige of the early industrial era is the 1826 remnant of Gunter's canal bridge, still visible from platform 4 at West Brompton station.

=== Fulham in popular music and film ===
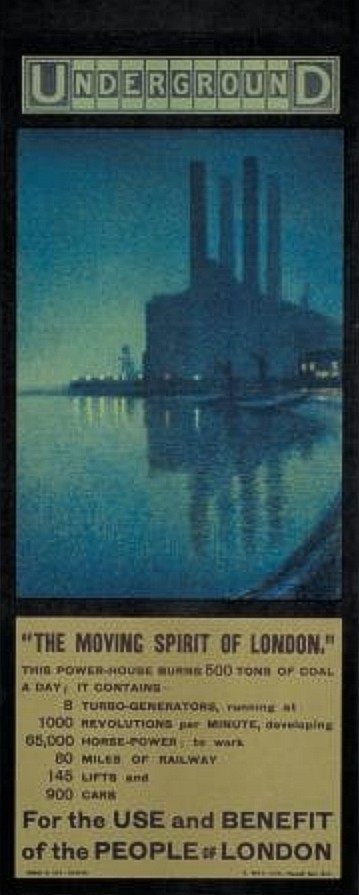
Thomas Robert Way

Fulham has several references in song lyrics:

- The album, Passion Play, by progressive rock band, Jethro Tull, contains: There was a rush along the Fulham Road/There was a hush in the Passion Play.
- London's Brilliant Parade by Elvis Costello, has the lyrics: From the gates of St. Mary's/There were horses in Olympia/And a trolley bus in Fulham Broadway.
- The debut album of punk band The Lurkers in 1978 was named Fulham Fallout, in honour of their rehearsing space in the basement of the Beggars Banquet record shop in Fulham. Their debut single "Shadow" / "Love Story" (July 1977) was Beggars Banquet Records first release, making them the first band on this label.
- What A Waste by Ian Dury and the Blockheads, contains the lines: I could be a writer with a growing reputation/I could be a ticket man at Fulham Broadway Station.
- Kiss Me Deadly by Billy Idol's 1970s punk rock band, Generation X, paints a gritty picture of casual street violence in 1970s Fulham. The song contains the refrain: Having fun, in South West Six, as well as the line, Hustling down the Fulham Road/Doing deals with Mr Cool. The song also makes reference to The Greyhound Pub, since closed, in Fulham Palace Road, and to the subway under Hammersmith Broadway.
- Ejector Seat Reservation by alternative rock band, Swervedriver, has the line: And just don't tell me the Fulham score.
- Pretty Things by Take That has the line: At Fulham Broadway Station, I see them every day in 2010 album Progress.
- West London hip-hop artist, Example, released a comedy song, You Can't Rap, with the chorus line: You can't rap, my friend/You're white and you're from Fulham/Please put down the mic./ There's no way you can fool them.

Fulham has been featured in films including The Omen and The L-Shaped Room. Fulham Broadway Underground station was used in Sliding Doors.

Esther Rantzen, presenter of long-running BBC One TV magazine, That's Life! frequently used North End market to gauge public opinion (vox pop).

=== Education ===
Fulham is home to several schools, including independent pre-preparatory and preparatory schools. Noted Fulham secondary establishments are the Grade II Listed Fulham Cross Girls School, The London Oratory School, Lady Margaret School and Fulham Cross Academy. There is also Kensington Preparatory School, that moved from Kensington into a former convent, next to Fulham Library in 1997. To cater for the large French-speaking population in the area, a French language primary school, 'Marie d'Orliac', has opened in the Grade II listed former Peterborough School near Parsons Green tube station. It is a feeder school for the Lycée Français Charles de Gaulle in South Kensington.

== Transport ==
An early account of Fulham, from a pedestrian's viewpoint, is provided by Thomas Crofton Croker in his journal published in 1860.

=== Rail ===
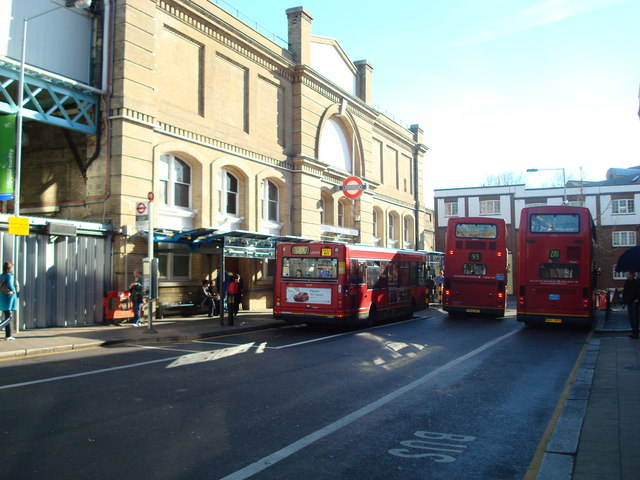
Putney Bridge Underground station entrance

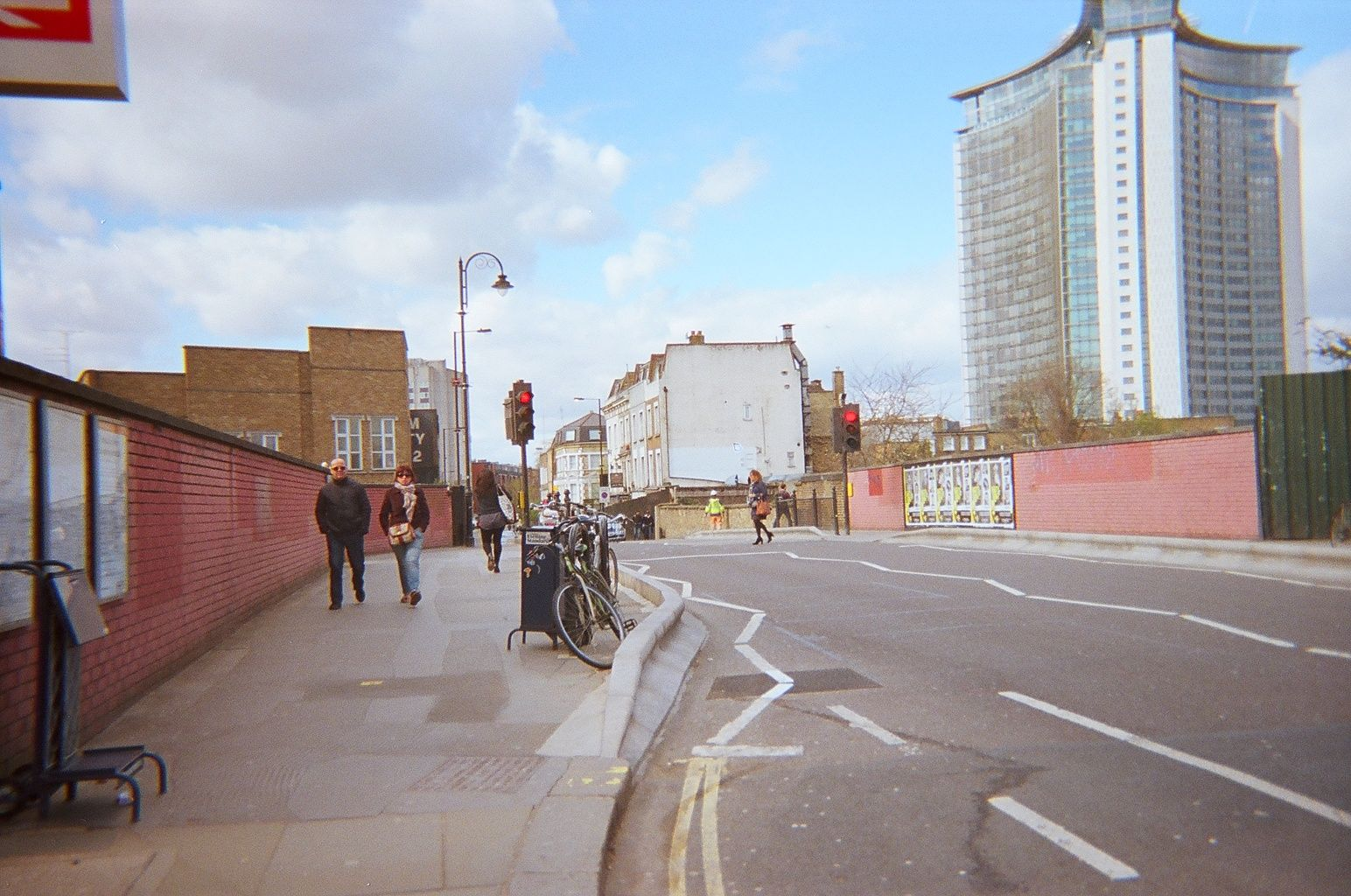
From West Brompton station, looking over Lillie Bridge into Fulham, 2015

Fulham nestles in a loop of the Thames across the river from Barnes and Putney. It straddles the Wimbledon and Richmond/Ealing Broadway branches of the District line of the tube — Fulham's tube stations are Putney Bridge, Parsons Green, Fulham Broadway (originally named Walham Green), West Kensington (originally Fulham - North End) and Baron's Court.

The London Overground West London Line stops at West Brompton, just inside the Fulham borough boundary, and at Imperial Wharf in Fulham, Sands End. Until 1940 there was a Chelsea and Fulham railway station on this line, close to Stamford Bridge Stadium on Fulham Road, but this was closed following World War II bomb damage.

=== Major roads ===
Major urban routes, or trunk roads, cross the area: The Talgarth Road — the A4, Fulham Palace Road — the A218 road, Fulham Road — the A219 road, the New King's Road — the A308 road, Wandsworth Bridge Road — the A217 road, Dawes Road — the A3219 road, Lillie Road — the A3218 road.

=== River crossings ===
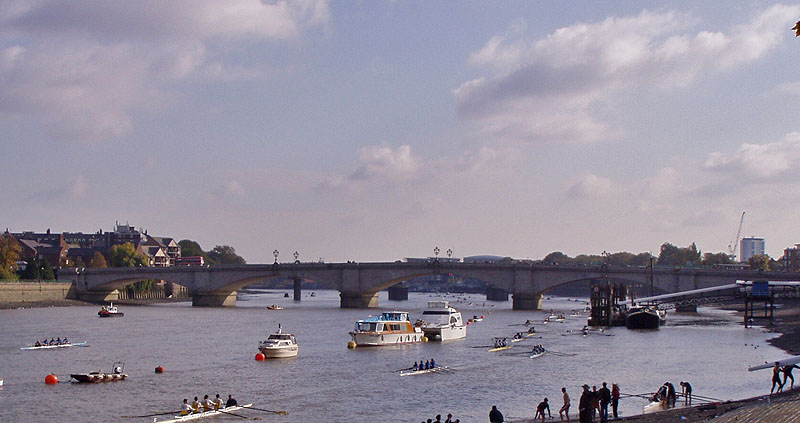
Putney Bridge with Fulham on the left

By road:

- Wandsworth Bridge
- Putney Bridge
- Lillie Bridge, formerly a Thames tributary crossing, now over two railway routes.
- Counter's Bridge at Olympia, over the West London Line in the Counter's creek littoral.

By rail:

- Cremorne Bridge
- Fulham Railway Bridge

== Places of interest ==
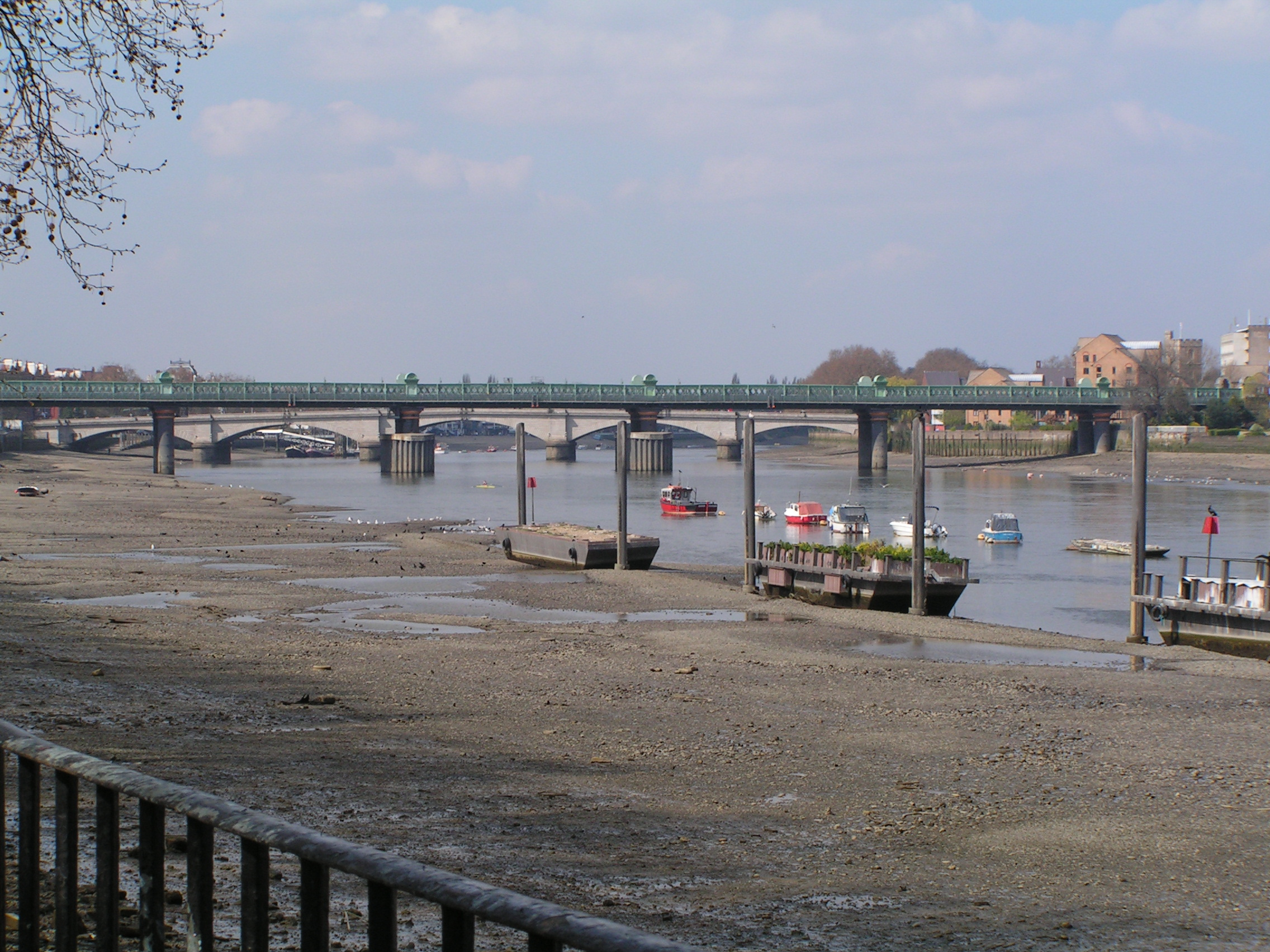
Fulham Railway Bridge at low tide

- Fulham Palace
- Fulham Pottery
- Margravine Cemetery
- Bishops Park
- Chelsea Harbour
- Stamford Bridge (stadium)
- All Saints' Church
- Craven Cottage
- New King's Road
- Riverside Studios, refurbished
- South Park, Fulham
- St Thomas of Canterbury Church, Fulham, the only complete A. W. Pugin church in London
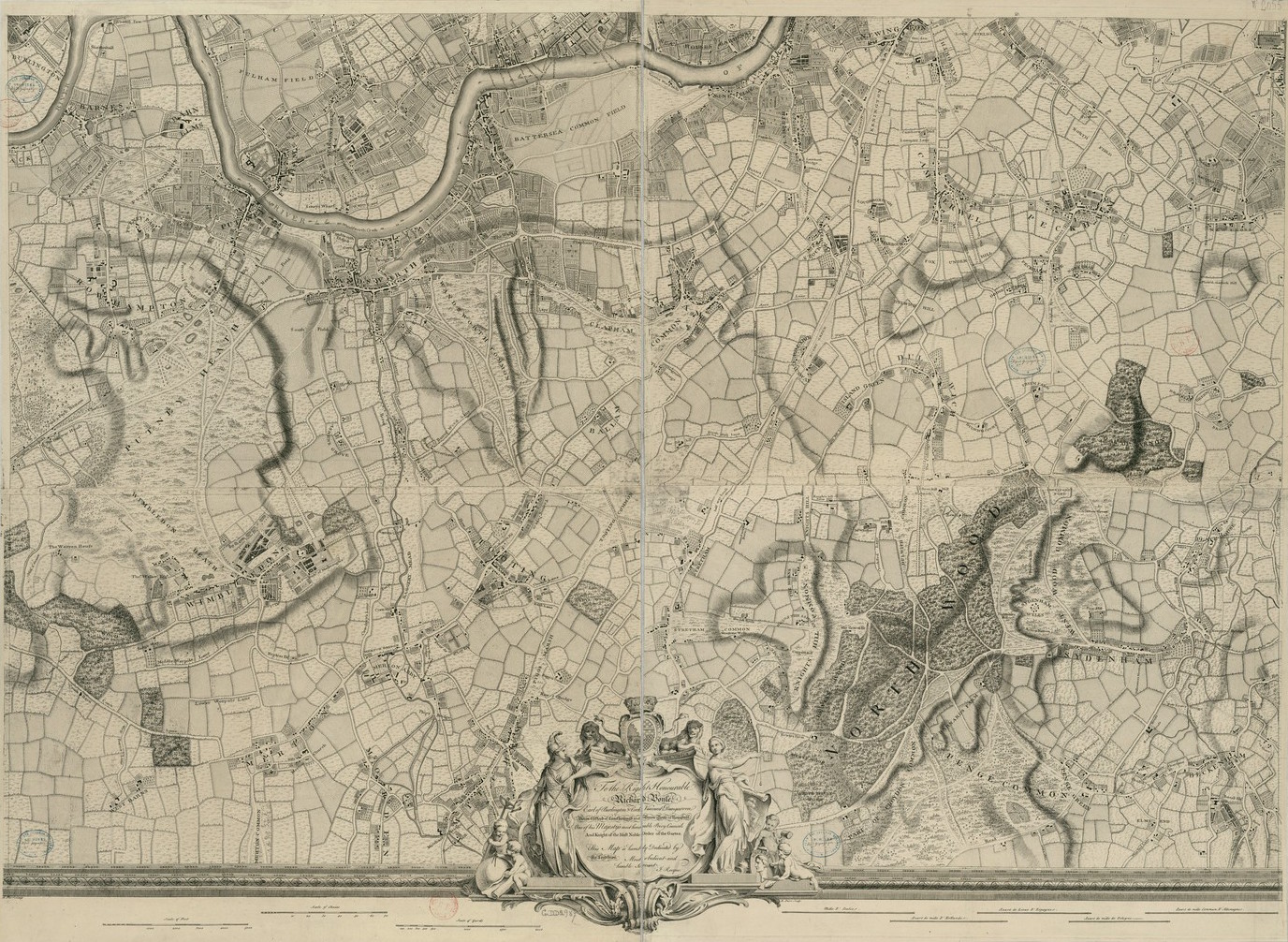
This sheet extract is a clickable image for enlargement

== Notable residents ==
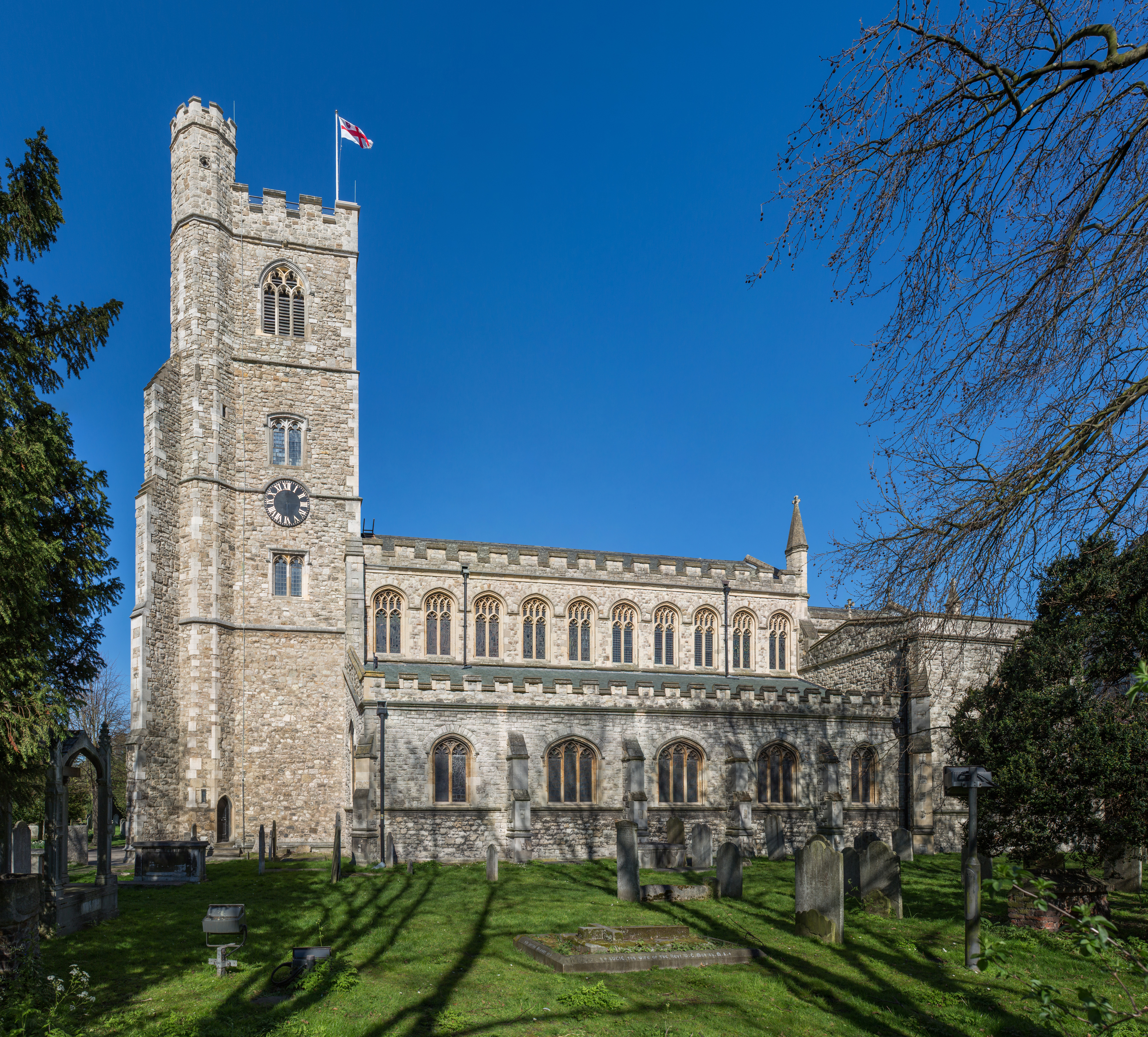
All Saints Church, Fulham, London - Diliff

- Joseph Addison (1672–1719), essayist, playwright lived at Sands End
- Francesco Bartolozzi (1725–1815), Italian engraver
- Joseph Bickley (1835–1923), Lillie Road-based Real tennis court designer and restorer
- Kathleen Bliss (1908–1989), theologian and official of the World Council of Churches
- Arthur Blomfield (1829–1899), architect
- Charles James Blomfield (1786–1857), Bishop of London
- William John Burchell (1781–1863), explorer, naturalist, artist, and author
- Edward Burne-Jones (1833–1898), artist
- Georgiana Burne-Jones (1840–1920), painter and writer, friend of George Eliot
- Sir William Butts (1486–1545), physician to King Henry VIII of England
- Sir Clifford Chetwood (born in Fulham, 1928), Chairman of George Wimpey
- Linford Christie (born 1960), Olympian athlete
- Johnny Claes (1916–1956), Belgian racing driver
- Henry Compton (1632–1713), Bishop of London
- Michael Cook (born 1933), Canadian playwright
- Elvis Costello (born 1954), spent part of his youth in the area
- Jill Craigie (1911–1999), documentary film maker and wife of Michael Foot
- Mandell Creighton (1843–1901), historian and Bishop of London; a popular social centre in Lillie Road is named after him.
- Jill Dando (1961-1999), BBC television presenter, lived in Fulham from 1994, until her murder on her doorstep in 1999.
- Geoffrey de Havilland (1882–1965), aviation pioneer, had his first aircraft building workshop in Fulham
- Evelyn De Morgan (1855–1919), painter in the Pre-Raphaelite tradition
- William De Morgan (1832–1917), potter, ceramicist, designer and novelist
- Example (Elliot John Gleave) (born 1982), rapper, singer, and songwriter
- Benjamin Rawlinson Faulkner (1787–1849), society portrait painter, lived in Richmond (Lillie) Road
- Charles James Féret (1854–1921), editor and historian of Fulham
- Geoffrey Fisher (1887–1972), Bishop of London, then translated to the See of Canterbury
- Maria Fitzherbert (1756–1837), companion, and possibly wife, of King George IV
- Samuel Foote (1721–1777), dramatist, actor and manager
- Henri Gaudier-Brzeska (1891–1915), expressionist sculptor and artist spent the last 5 years of his short life in Fulham
- Edmund Gibson (1669–1748), Bishop of London
- Eugène Goossens, fils (1867–1958), musician and his four musical children: Sir Eugene Aynsley Goossens, Léon Jean Goossens, Marie and Sidonie Goossens
- Nell Gwyn (1650–1687), companion to Charles II of England, has a close named after her in Fulham
- Alfred Hackman (1811–1874), sub-librarian at the Bodleian Library
- Toni Halliday (born 1964), musician
- Andy Hamilton (born 1954), satirist, comic actor, writer and broadcaster
- Imogen Hassall (1942-1980), actress
- Thomas Hayter (1702–1762), Bishop of London
- Humphrey Henchman (1592–1675), Bishop of London
- Henry Holland (1745–1806), architect
- Theodore Hook (1788–1841), creator of the world's first postcard
- William Hurlstone (1876–1906), composer mostly of chamber music, born in Empress Place (formerly Richmond Gardens)
- Charlie Hutchison (1918–1993), British-Ghanaian communist, liberator of Belsen concentration camp, and only black British volunteer of the International Brigades
- John Jackson (1811–1885), Bishop of London
- Sajid Javid (born 1969), politician
- Nathaniel Kent (1737–1810), agriculturist
- Sir John Scott Lillie (1790–1868), Peninsular War veteran, inventor and North End resident
- Robert Lowth (1710–1787), Bishop of London
- Henry Montgomery Campbell (1887–1970), Bishop of London
- John Mordaunt, 1st Viscount Mordaunt (1626–1675), royalist conspirator prominent in the English Civil War
- John Osborne (1929–1994), playwright
- Baroness Phillips (1910–1992), Labour politician, radio personality, wife of Morgan Phillips and mother of Gwyneth Dunwoody
- Augustus Pugin (1812–1852), architect of St Thomas of Canterbury Church, Rylston Road
- Daniel Radcliffe (born 1989), actor
- Samuel Richardson (1689–1761), writer and printer
- John Robinson (1650–1723), Bishop of London
- Charles Rolls (1877–1910), co-founder of Rolls-Royce Limited and pioneer aviator, had his car showroom in the former Lillie Hall
- John Saris (1580–1643), captain of the first English ship to reach Japan
- Jean-Baptiste Say (1767–1832), French liberal economist known for Say's law on the behaviour of markets
- Joan Sims (1930-2001), British actress known for the Carry On films.
- Sylvia Guirey (1931–1997), was an heiress, artist and art patron and former husband of Prince Azamat Kadir Sultan Guirey.
- Granville Sharp (1735–1813), abolitionist and brother of William
- William Sharp (1729–1810), surgeon
- Thomas Sherlock (1678–1761), Bishop of London
- Sir Oswald Stoll (1866–1942), theatre impresario and benefactor
- Robert Stopford (1901–1976), briefly Bishop of Fulham, before becoming Bishop of London, the last to reside at Fulham Palace
- Janet Street-Porter (born 1946), journalist
- Richard Terrick (1710–1777), Bishop of London
- William Wand (1885–1977), Bishop of London
- Sir Ralph Warren (c. 1486–1553). twice Lord Mayor of London lived in Fulham House
- Bob White, (born 1936), cricketer, later umpire
- Leslie Arthur Wilcox (1904–1982), marine artist
- Emlyn Williams (1905–1987), actor, dramatist, author, lived at 15 Pelham Crescent from 1937 to 1962
- Sir William Withers (1657–1720), Lord Mayor of London
- Arthur Winnington-Ingram (1858–1946), Bishop of London (1901–1939), one of the longest serving bishops
- John Young (1797–1877), City architect and developer of Empress Place and Lillie Road
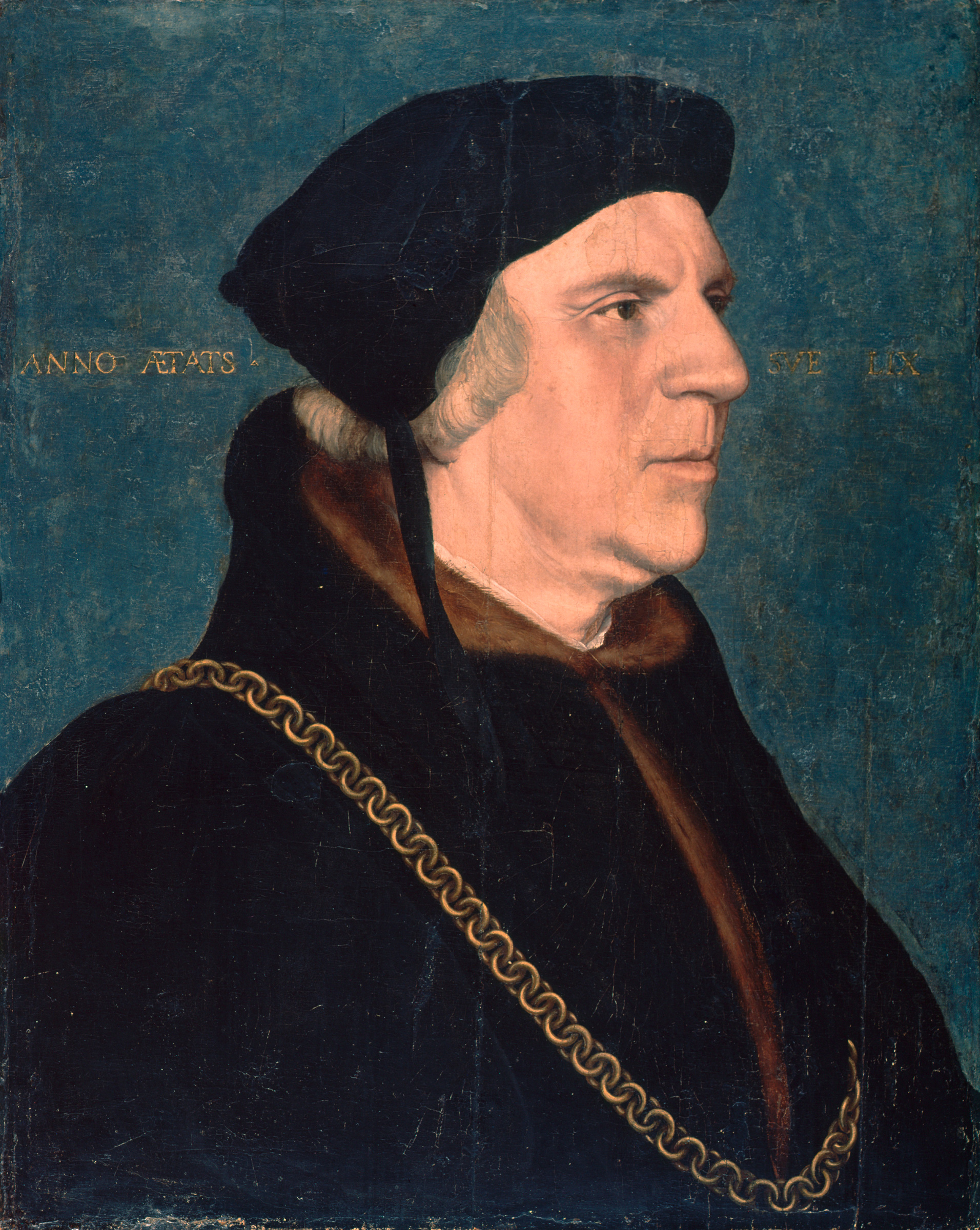
Portrait of William Butts, physician to Henry VIII. He came from Fulham

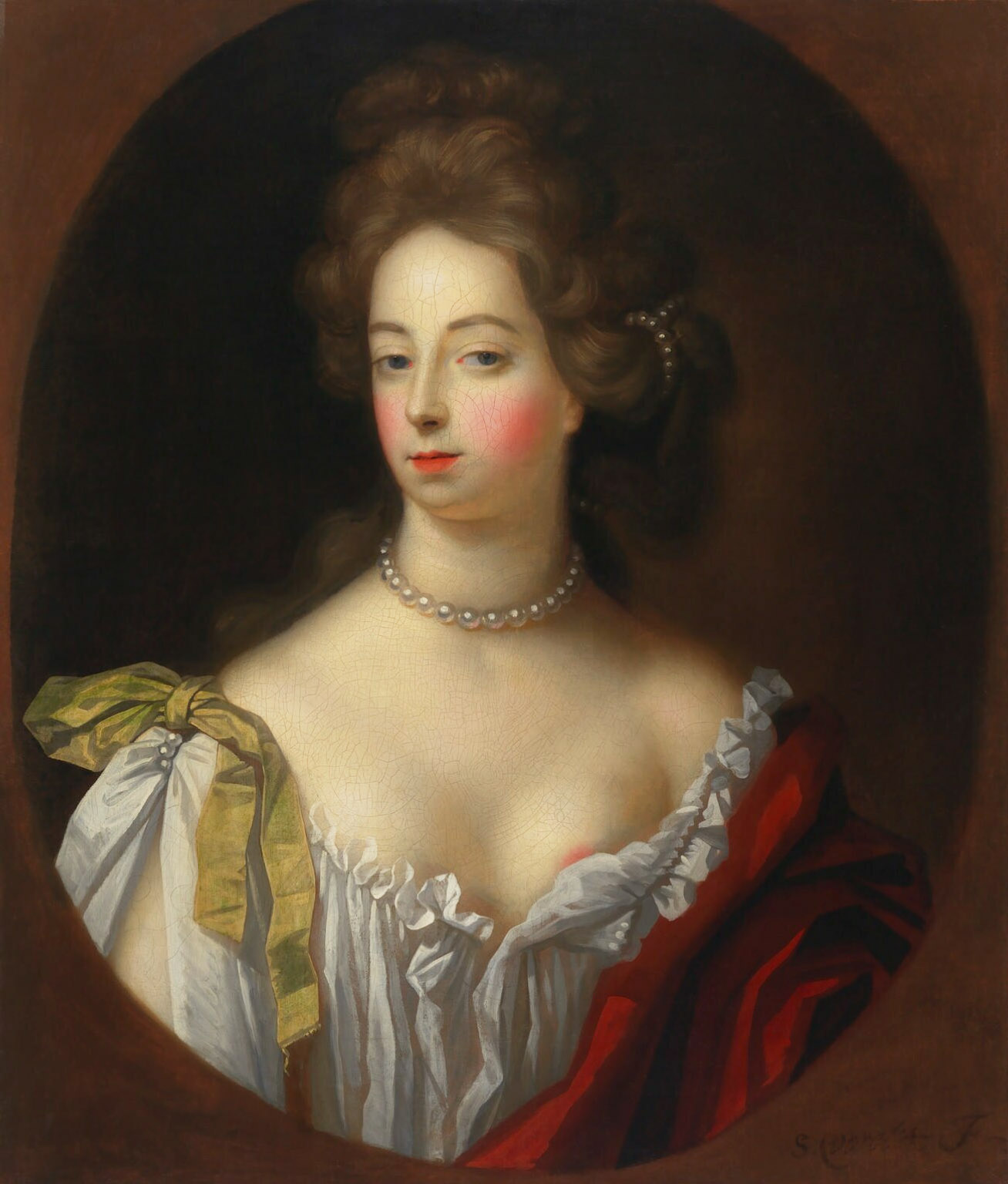
Nell Gwyn by Simon Verelst. She lived in Fulham

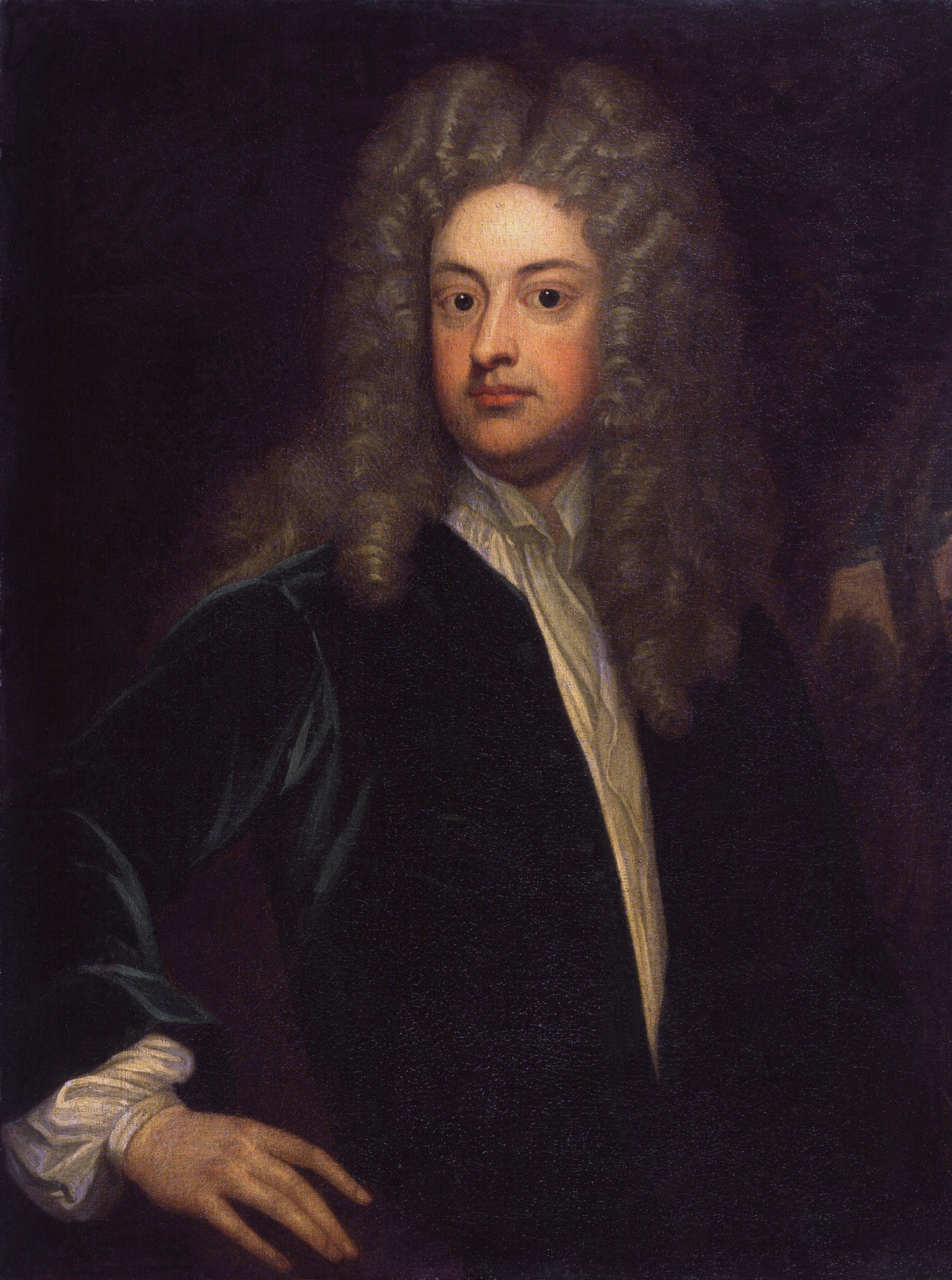
Kneller's portrait of Joseph Addison of Sands End

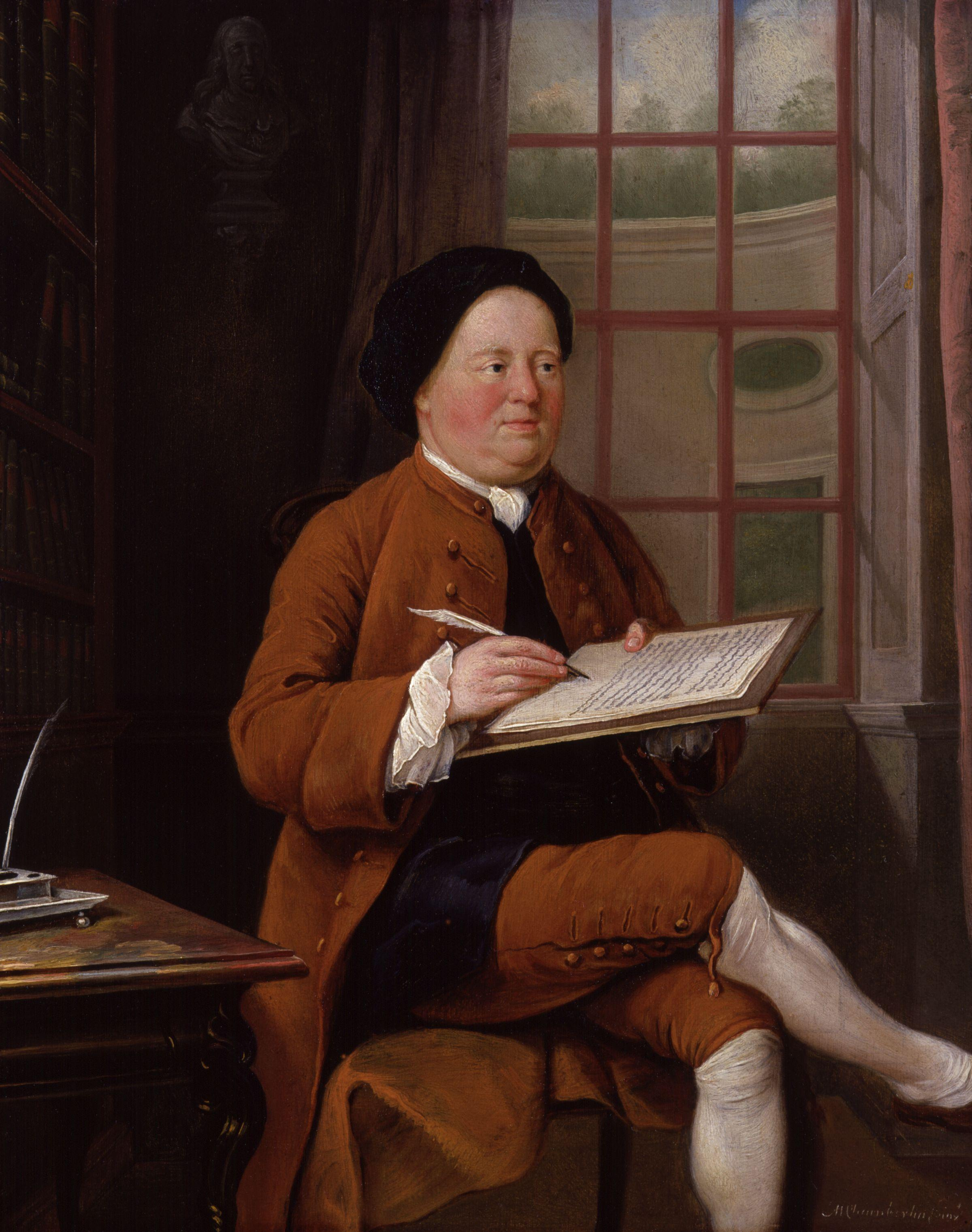
Novelist, Samuel Richardson, who moved from North End to Parsons Green

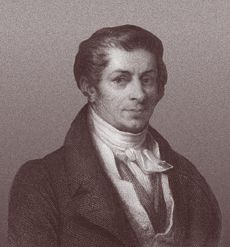
French liberal economist who in his youth stayed in Fulham

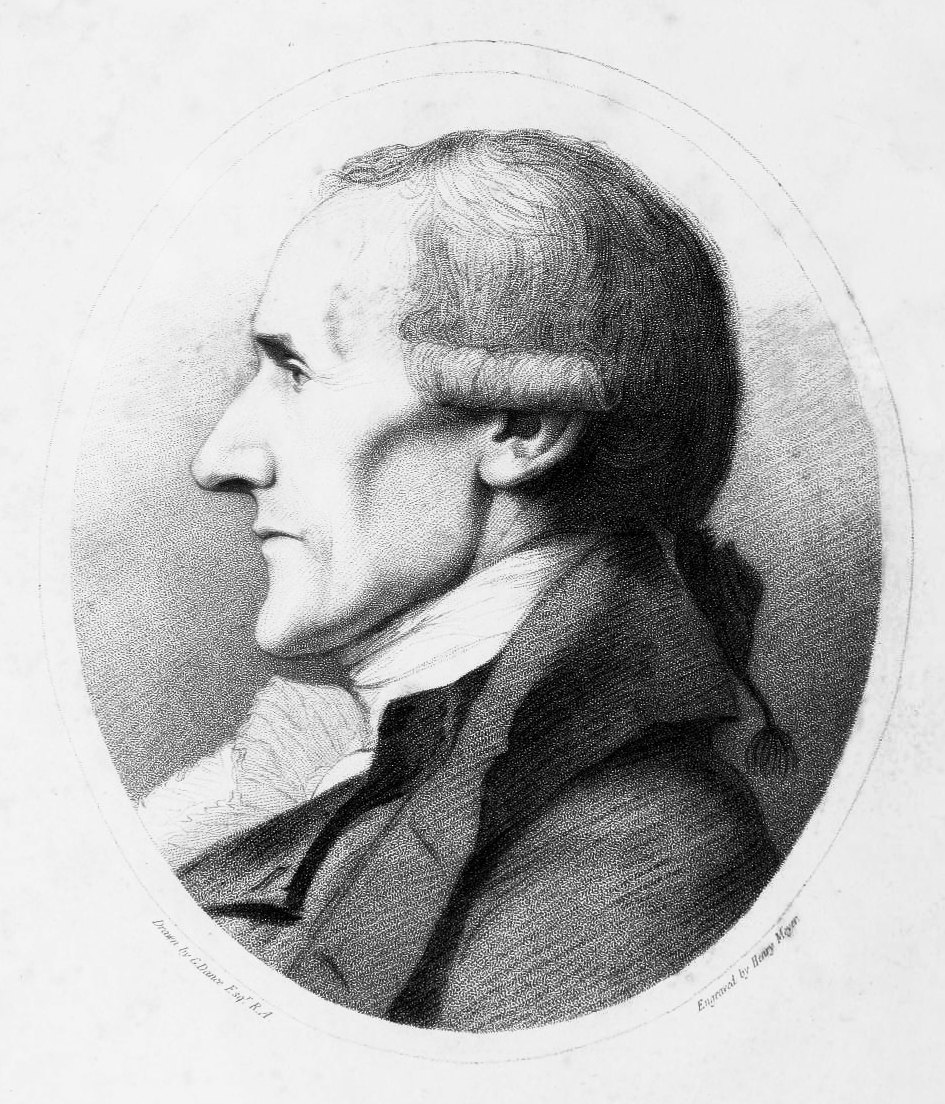
Granville Sharp (Hoare memoire). He is buried in Fulham

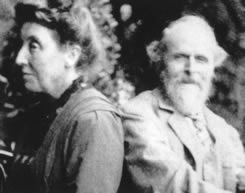
De Morgan and his wife, Evelyn. They lived and worked in Sands End

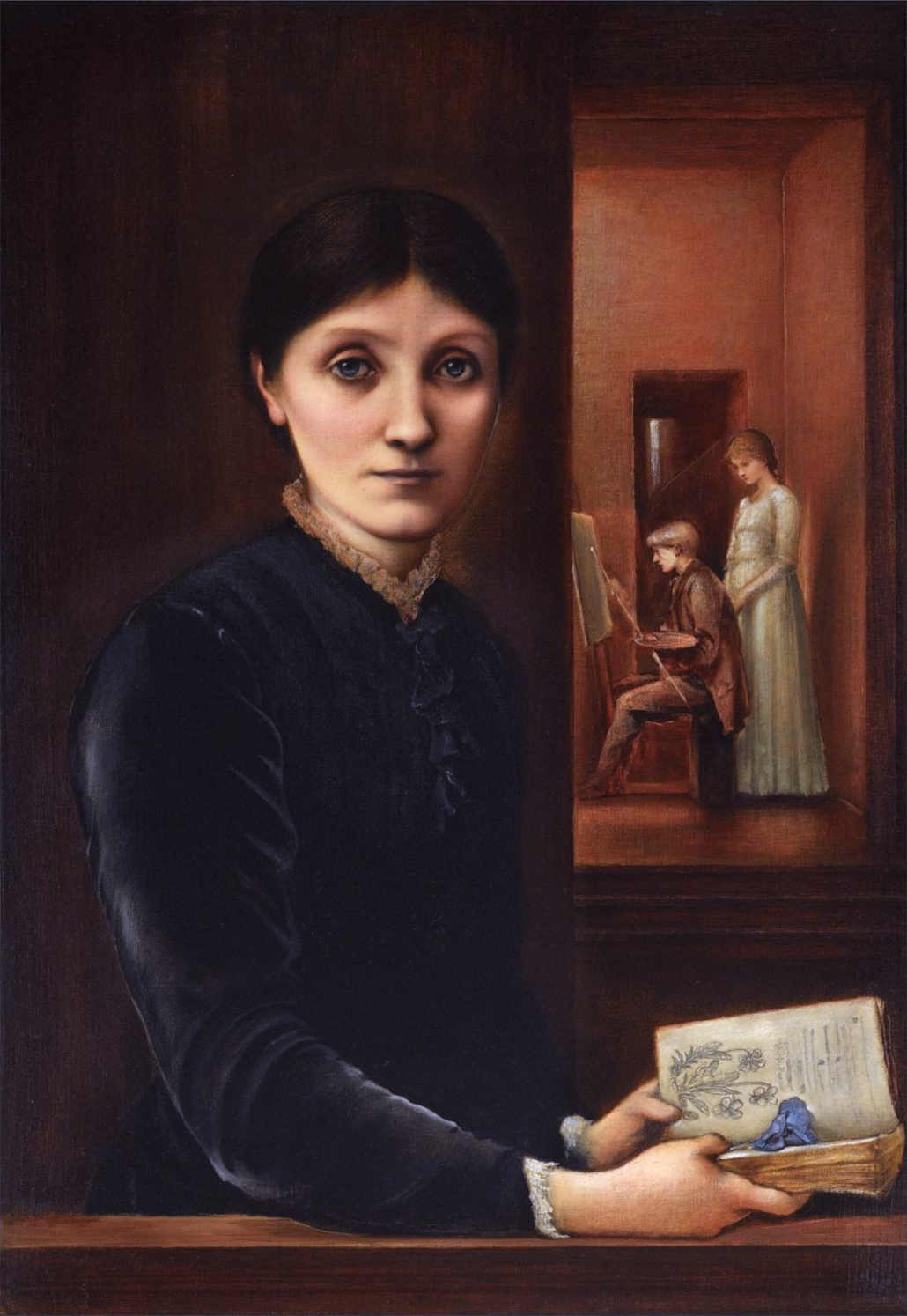
Georgiana Burne-Jones and children by Edward Coley Burne-Jones. They lived in North End

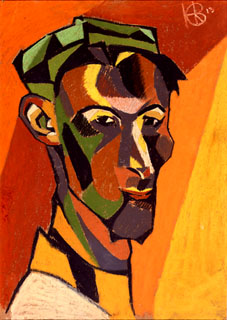
Henri Gaudier-Brzeska self-portrait

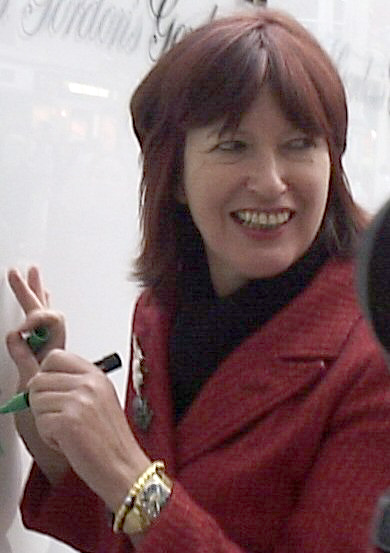
Janet Street-Porter grew up in Fulham

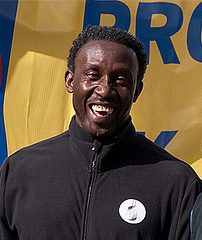
Linford Christie in 2009. He attended Henry Compton School

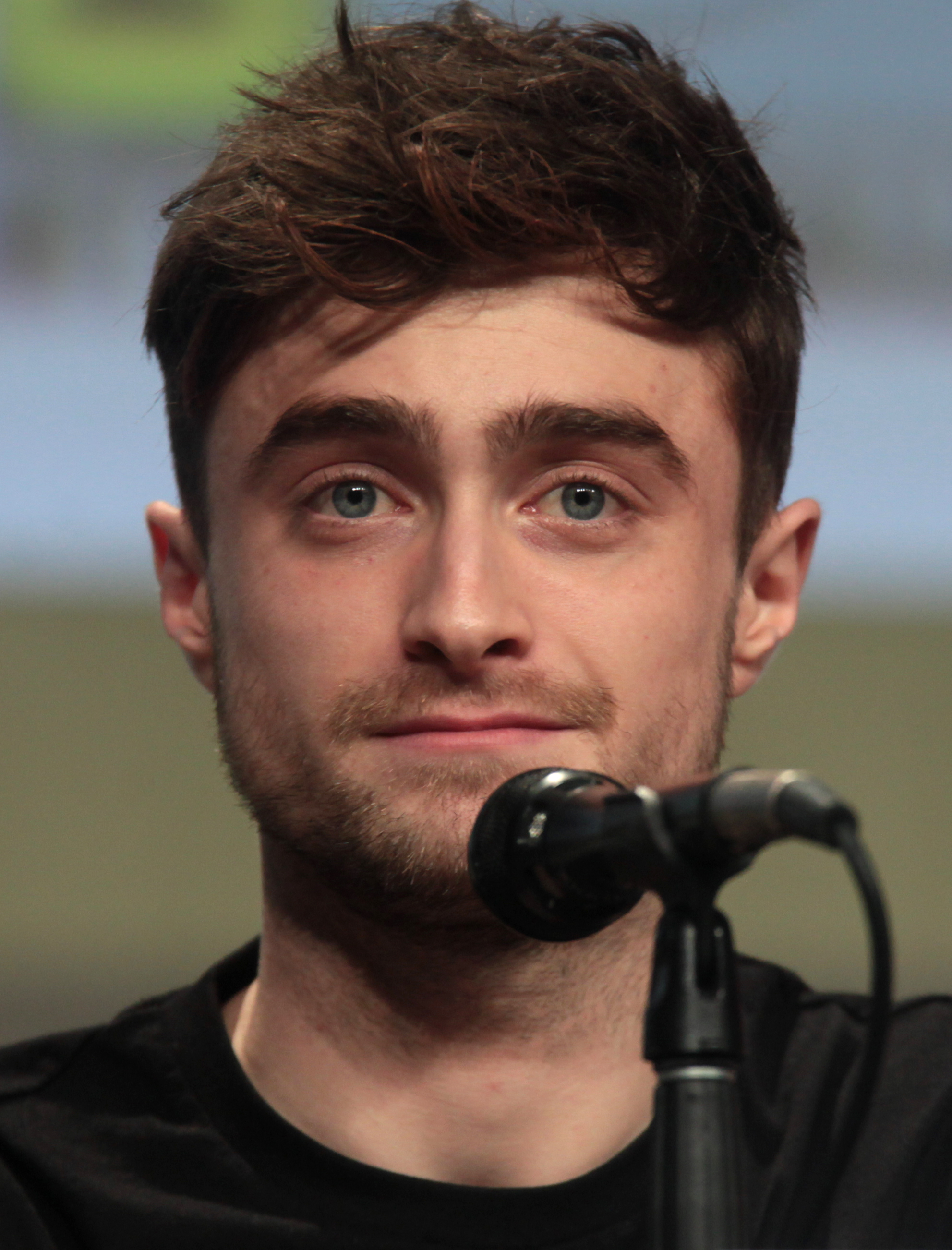
Daniel Radcliffe in 2014. He comes from Fulham

== See also ==
- List of districts in Hammersmith and Fulham
- Metropolitan Borough of Fulham
- Counter's Creek
- Kensington Canal
- Lots Road Power Station
- West London Line
- West Brompton station
- West Kensington
- Earls Court Exhibition Centre
- Sir John Scott Lillie
- Grade I and II* listed buildings in Hammersmith and Fulham
- Parks and open spaces in Hammersmith and Fulham
- Oxford and Cambridge Boat Race
- Little Australia

== Gallery ==
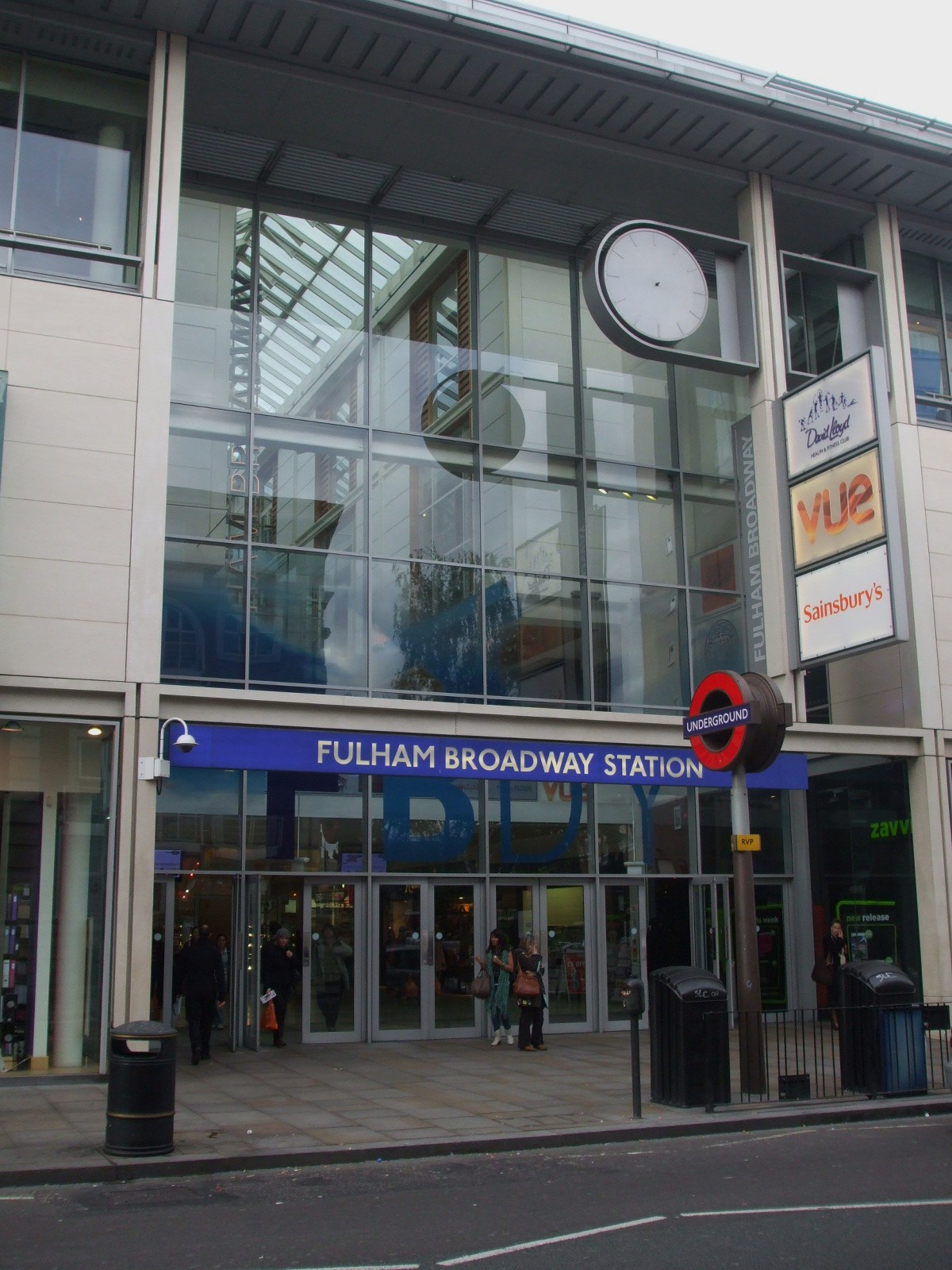
Entrance to Fulham Broadway station

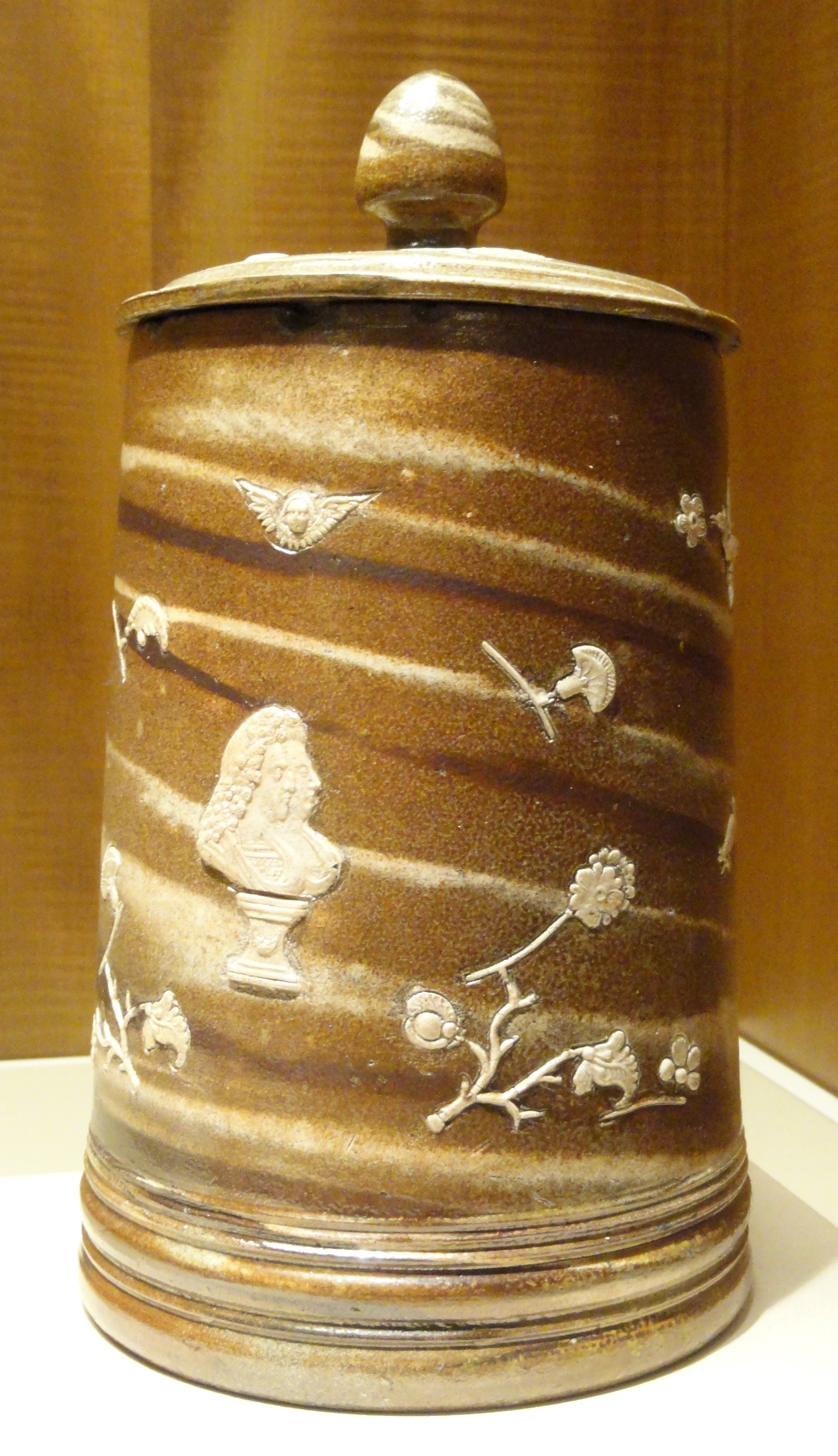
Covered tankard made by Fulham Pottery, c. 1685-1690

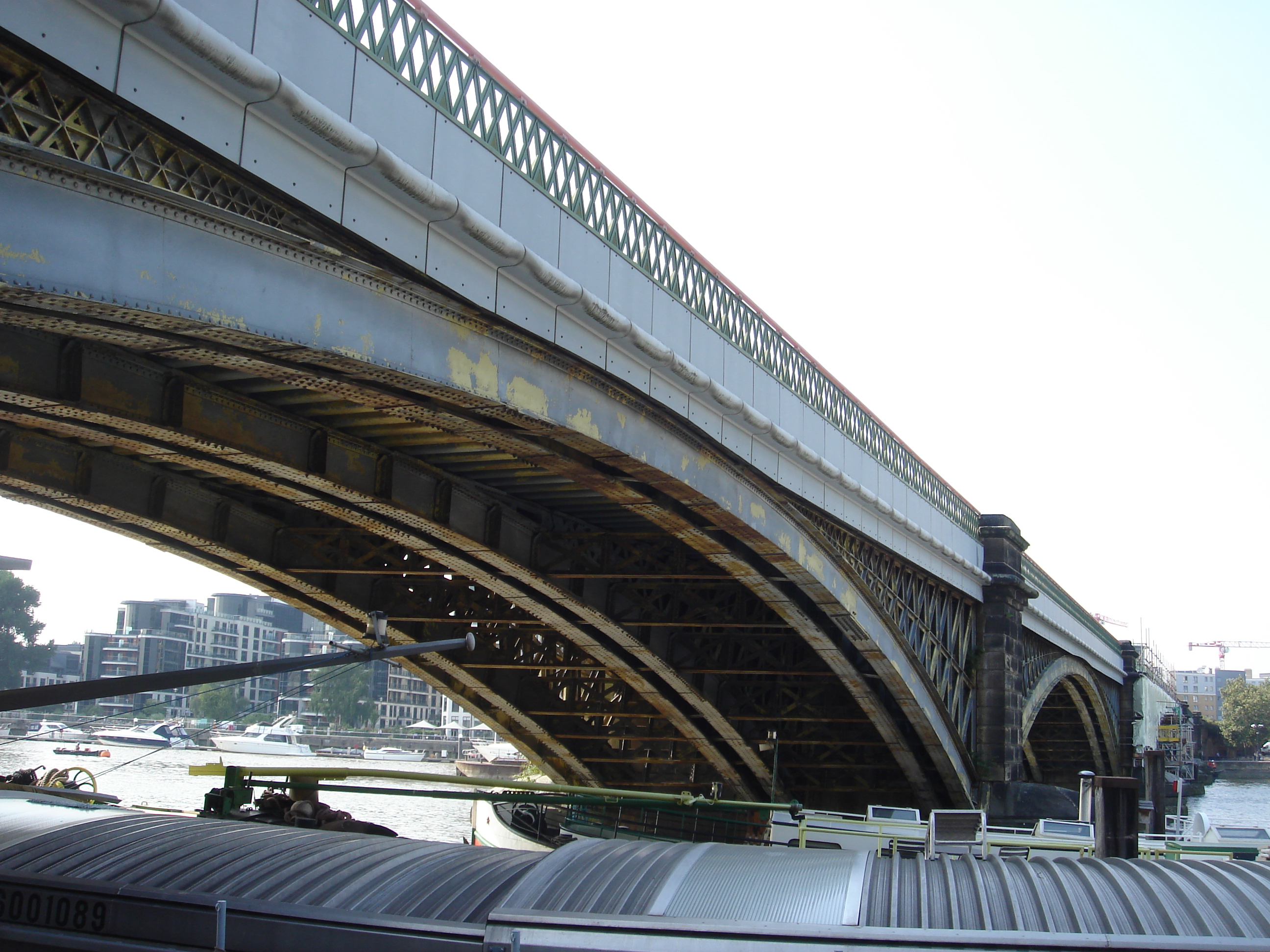
Cremorne Bridge, West London Extension Railway Bridge, towards Fulham

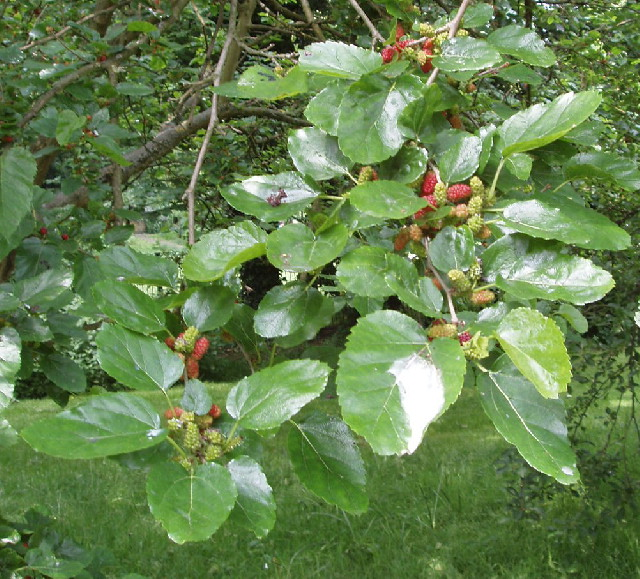
Mulberries at Fulham Palace

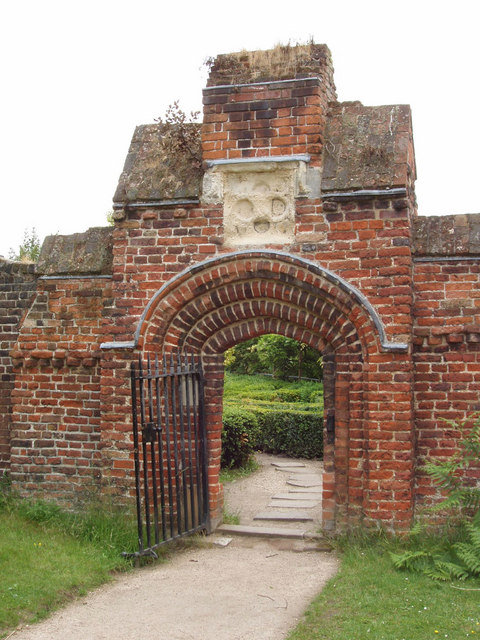
Tudor entrance to Fulham Palace kitchen garden

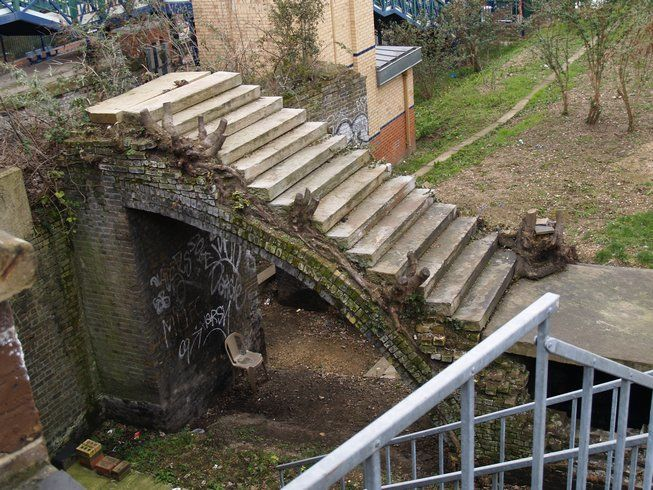
vestige of 1826 canal bridge from Lillie Bridge, Fulham

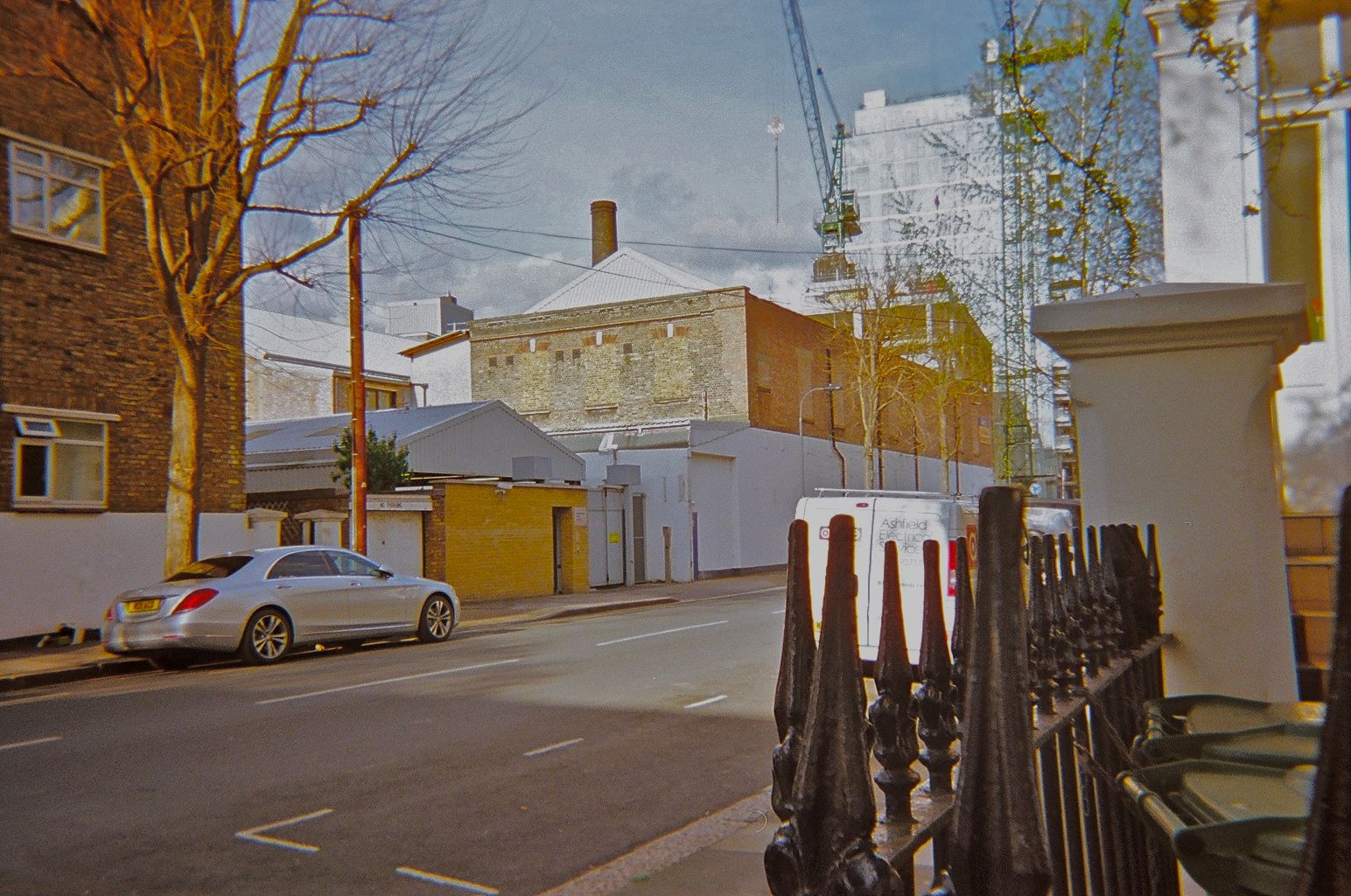
Corbett & McClymont's 1870 Carpentry workshop in Seagrave Road, Fulham

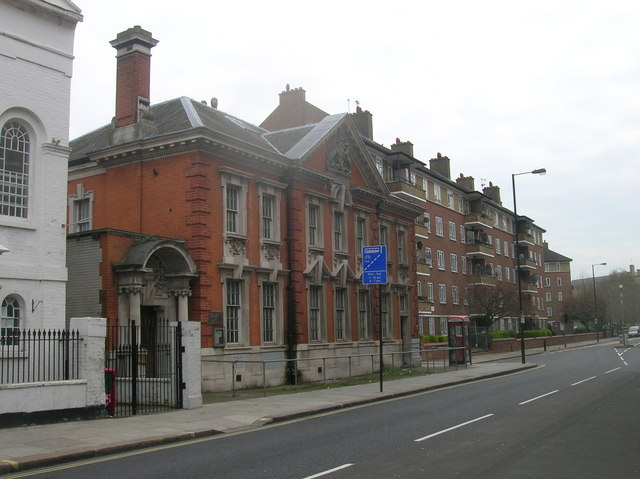
Former Fulham County Court House in North End Road

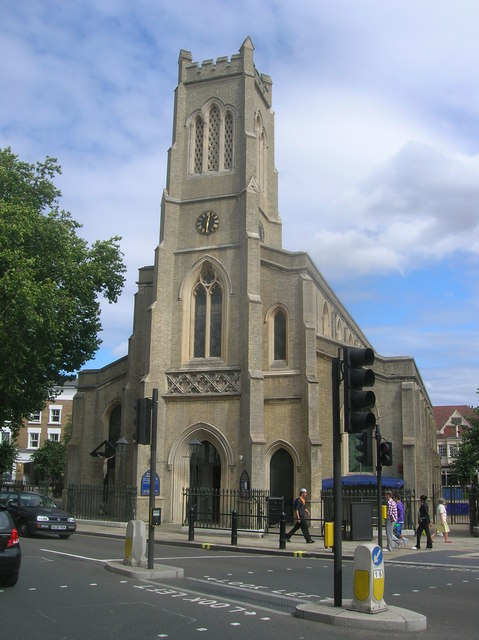
Parish Church of St John, Fulham

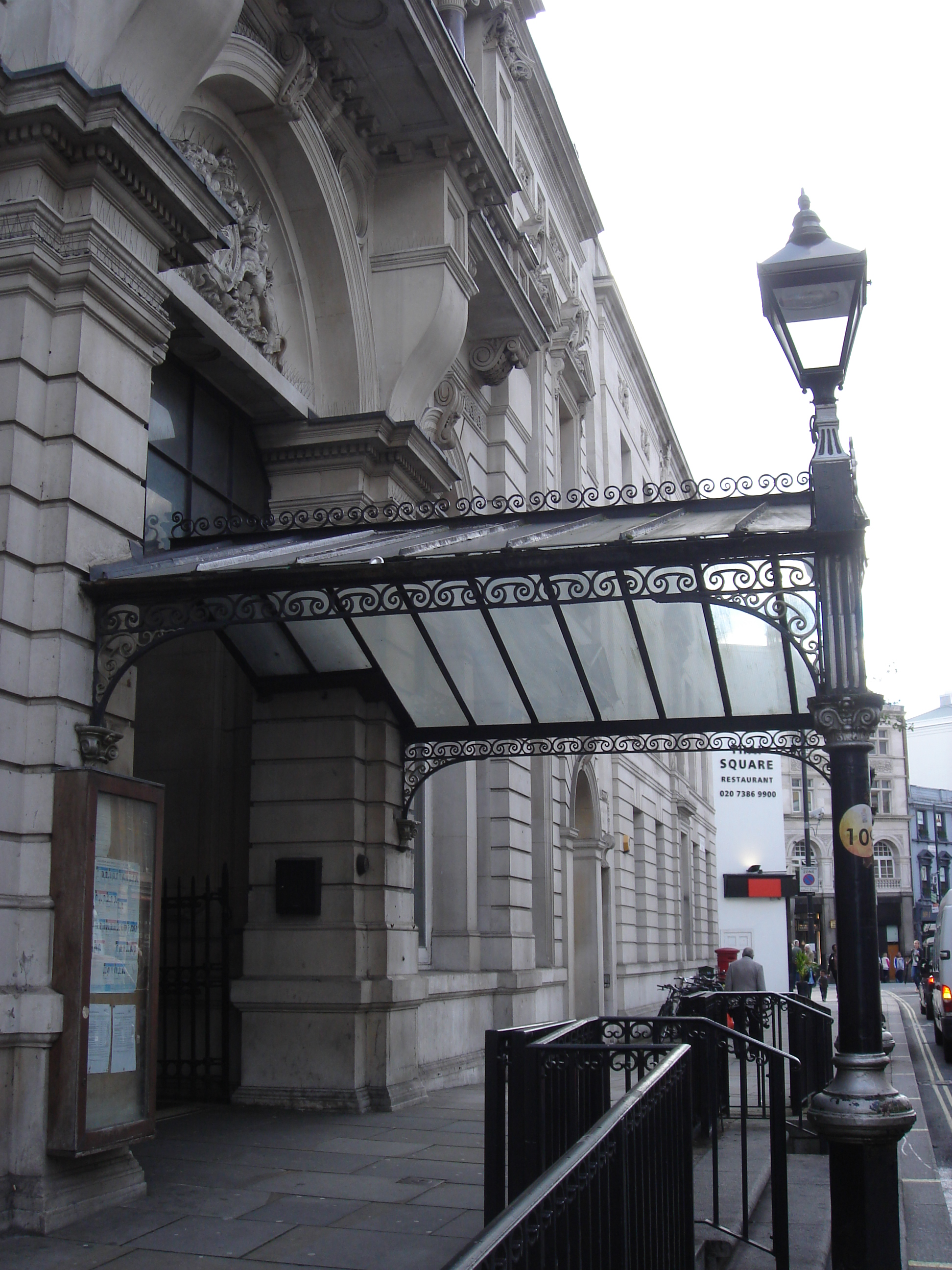
Fulham Town Hall entrance in Fulham Road

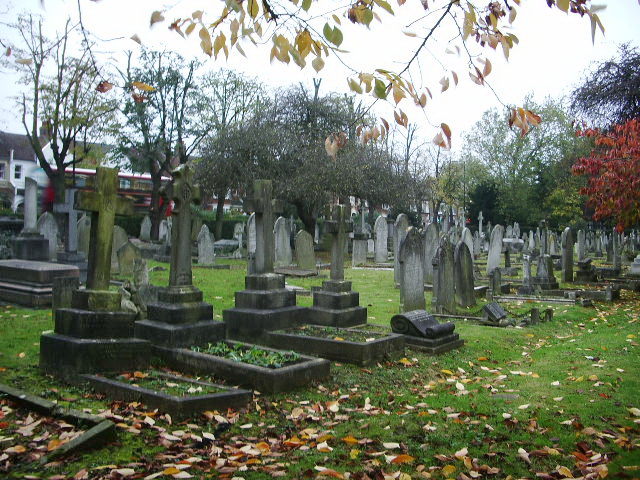
Fulham Cemetery in Fulham Palace Road

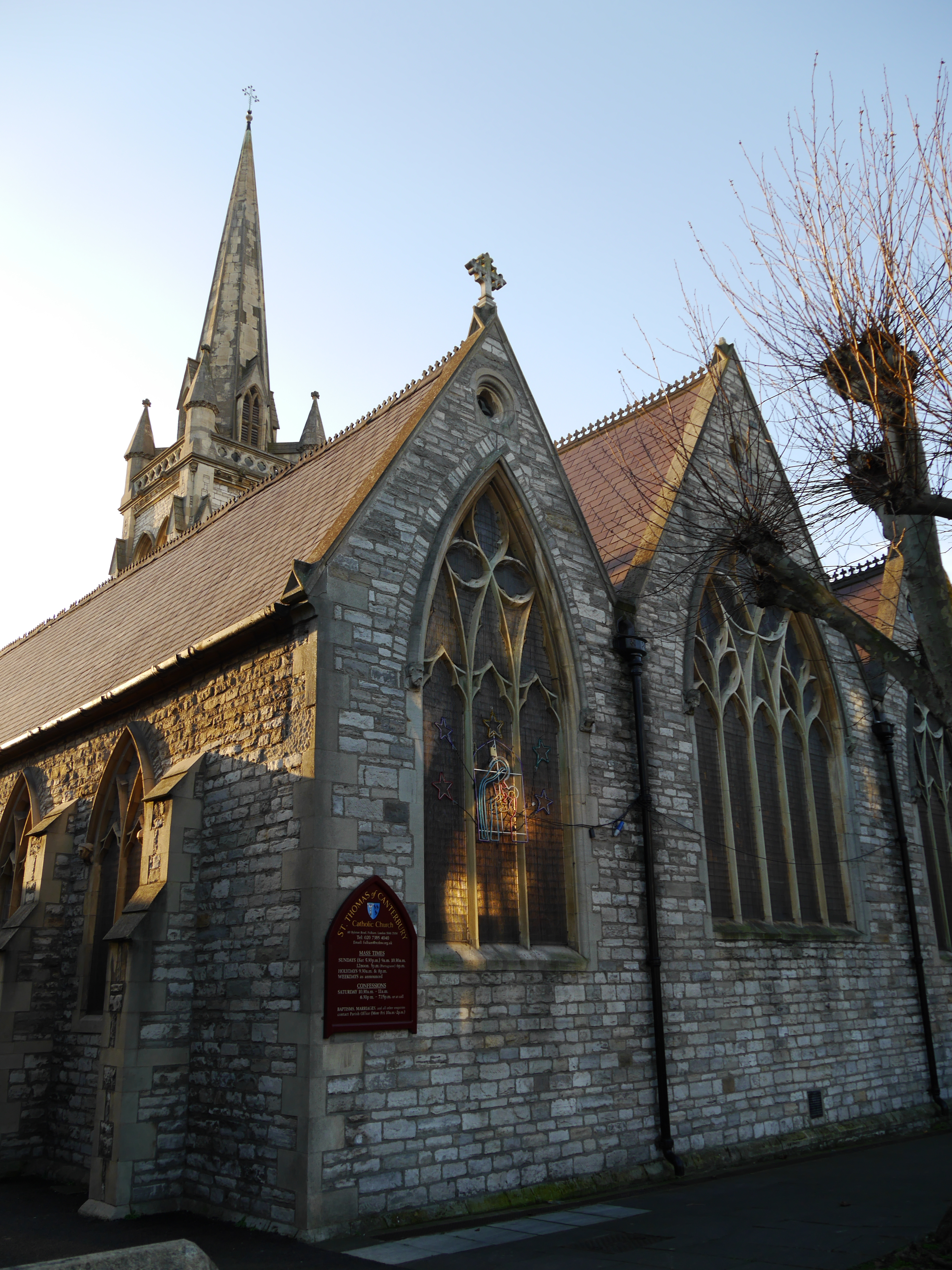
Pugin's St Thomas RC Church in Rylston Road, Fulham

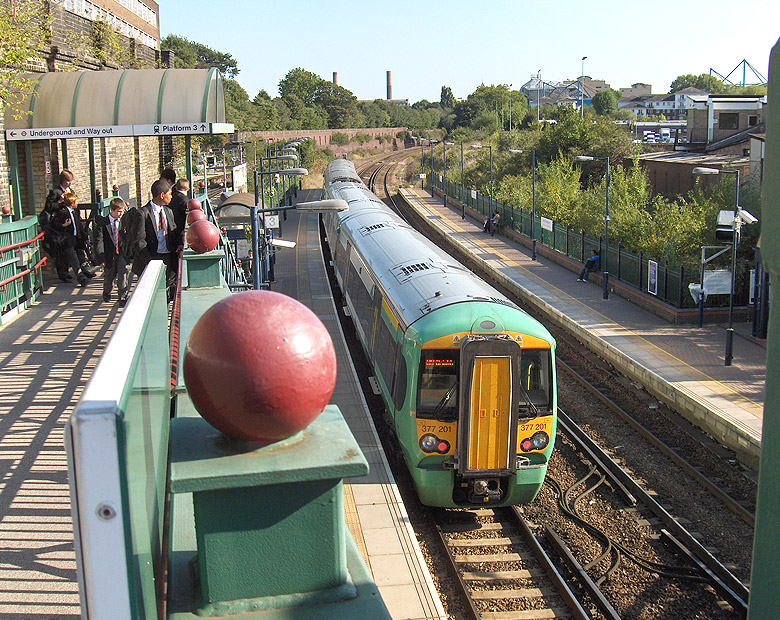
London Overground at West Brompton in Fulham

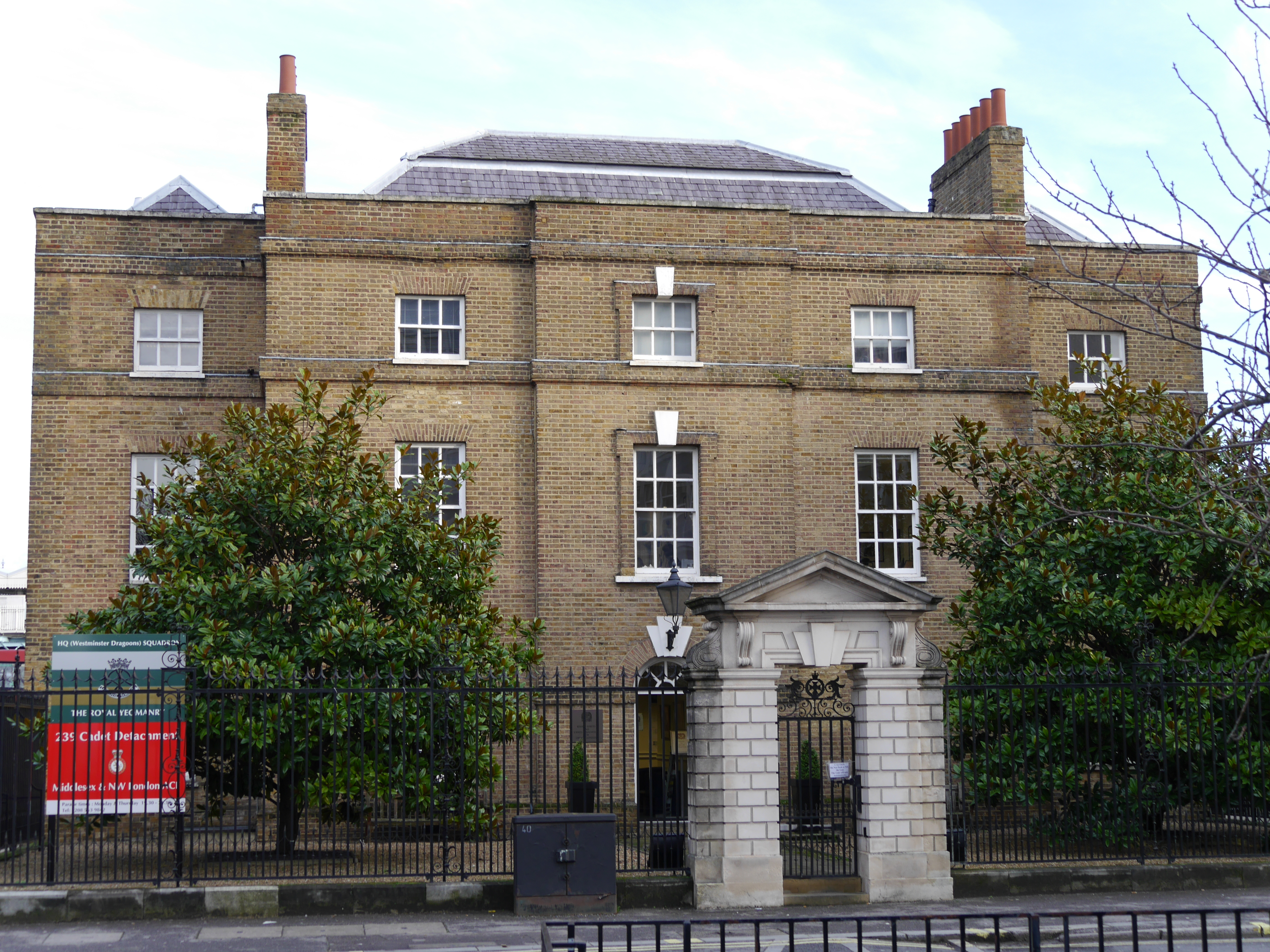
Fulham House in Fulham High Street

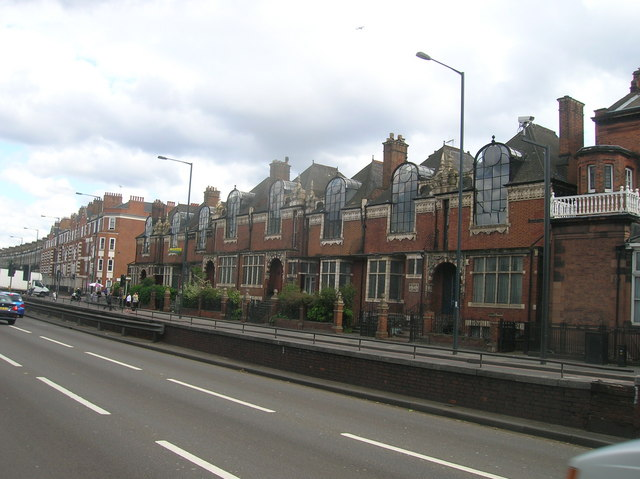
St Paul's Studios, Talgarth Road

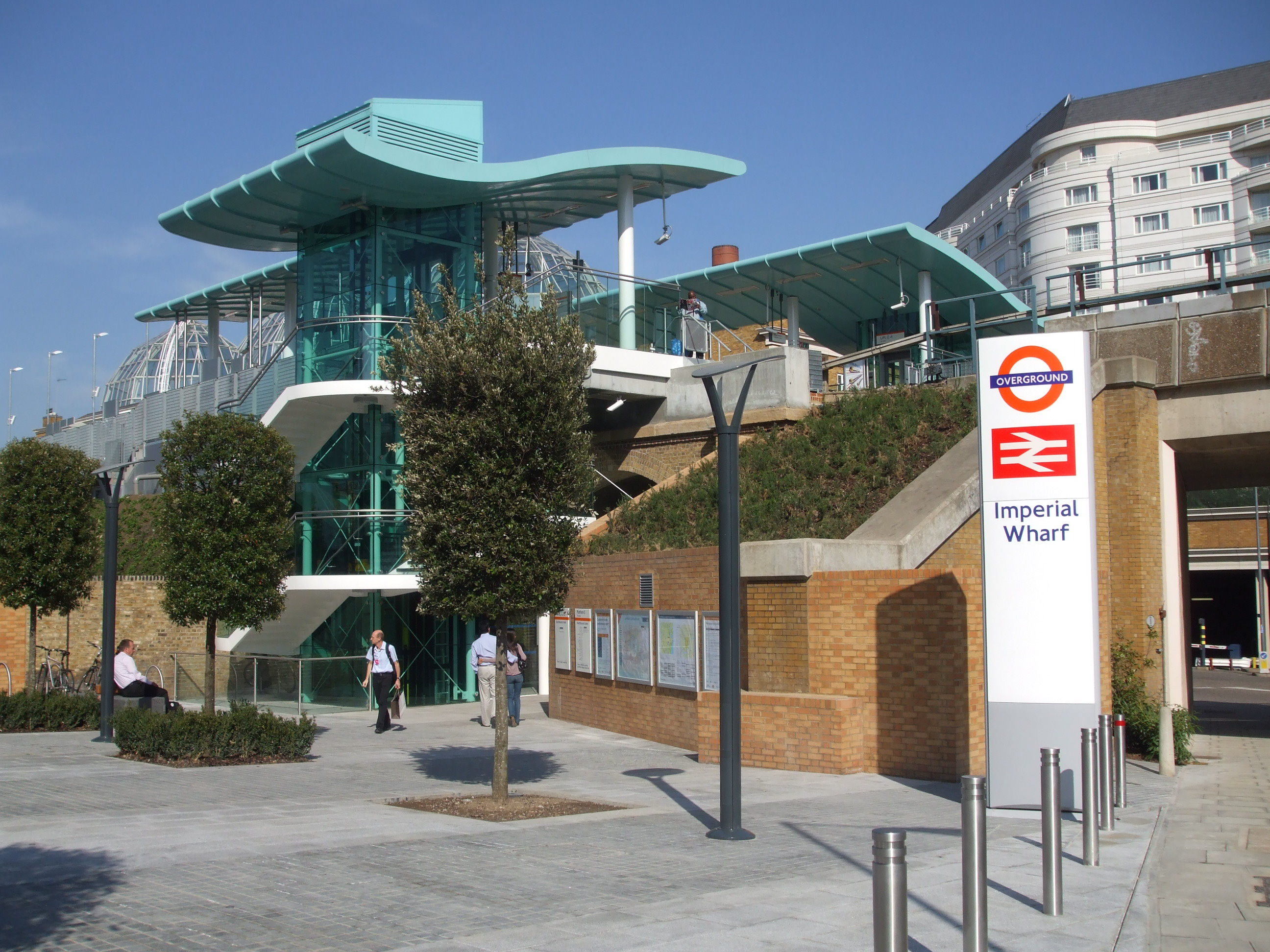
Imperial Wharf station western entrance 2

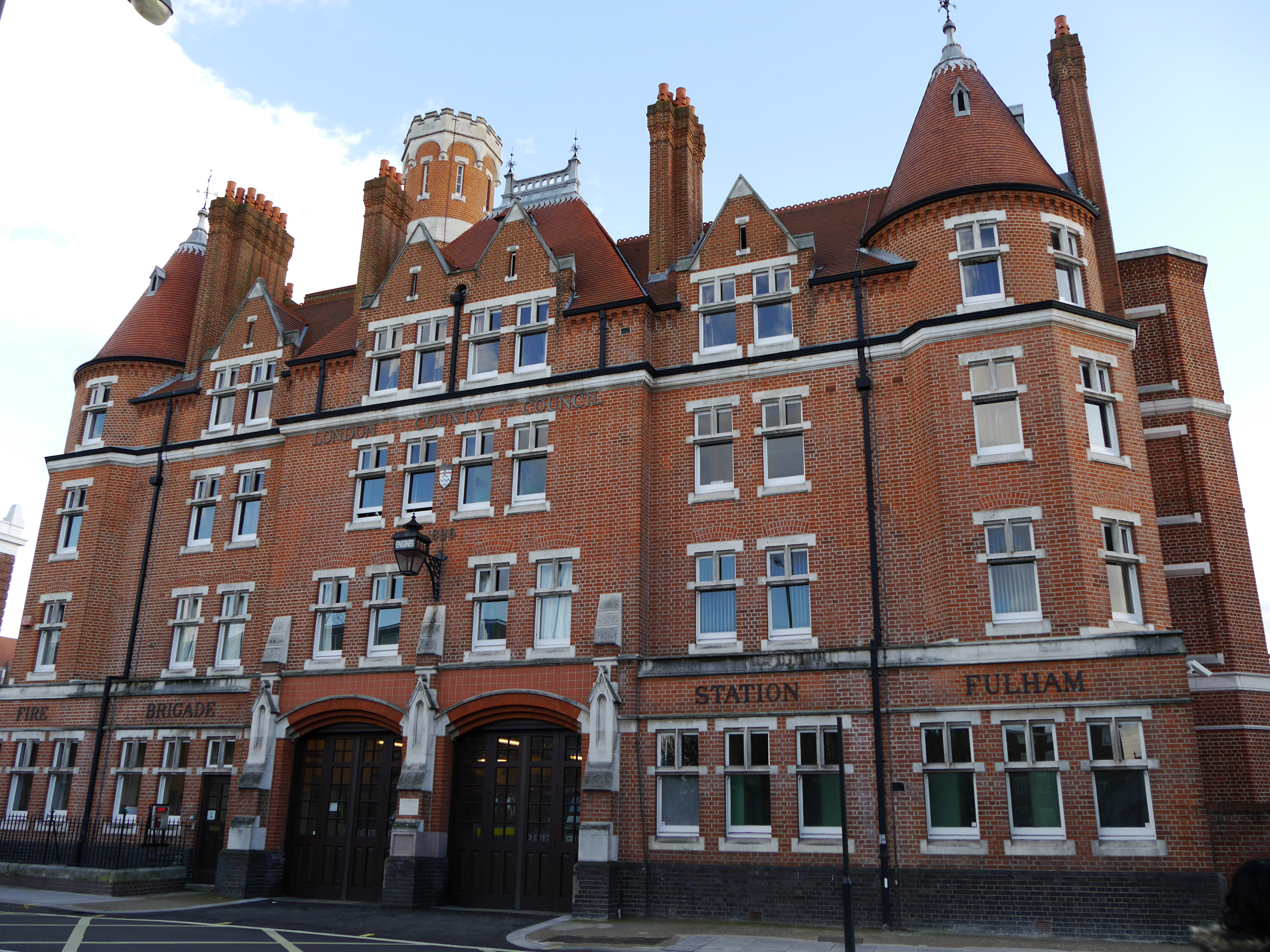
Fulham Fire Station

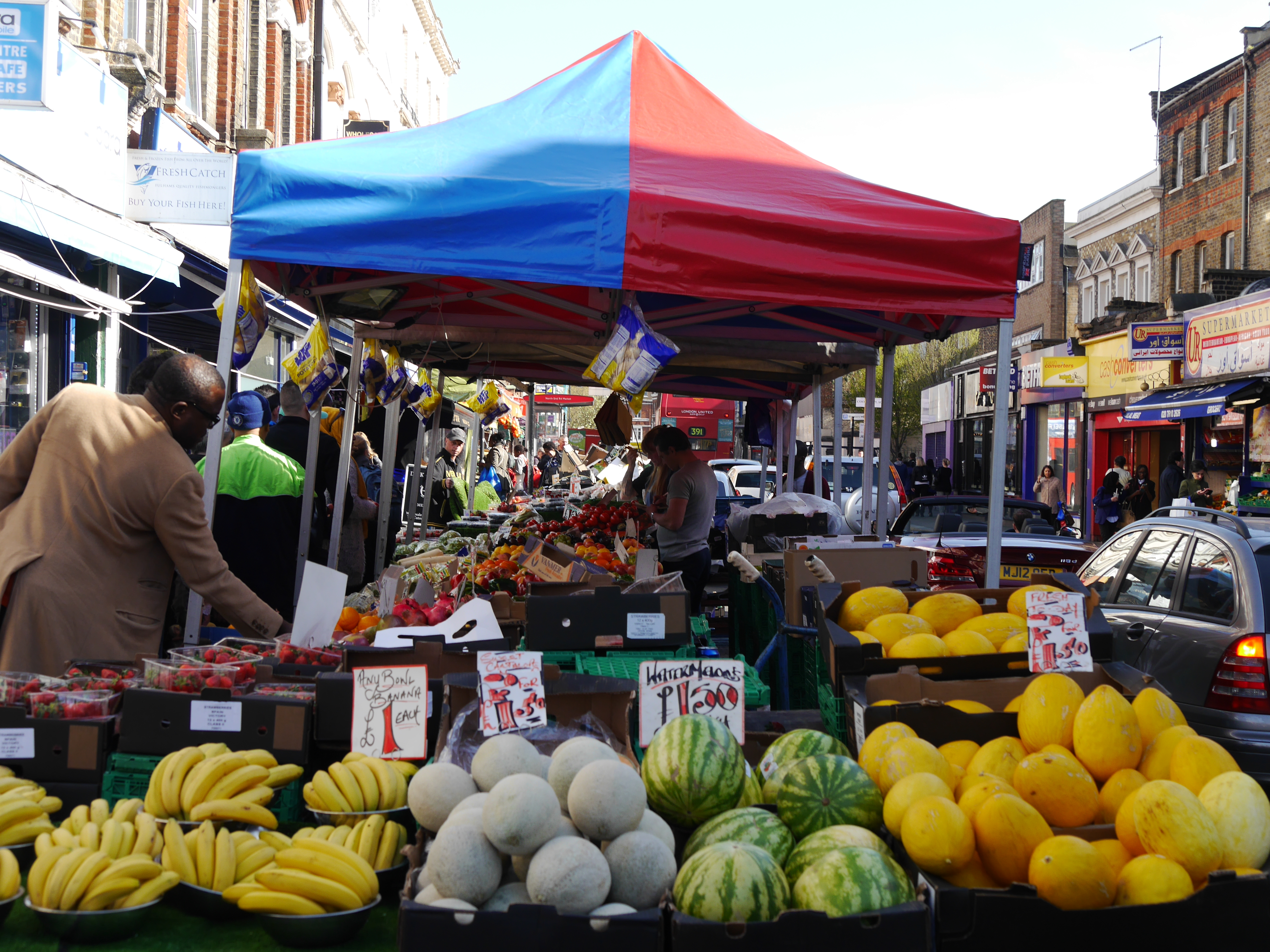
Market, North End Road, Fulham, London

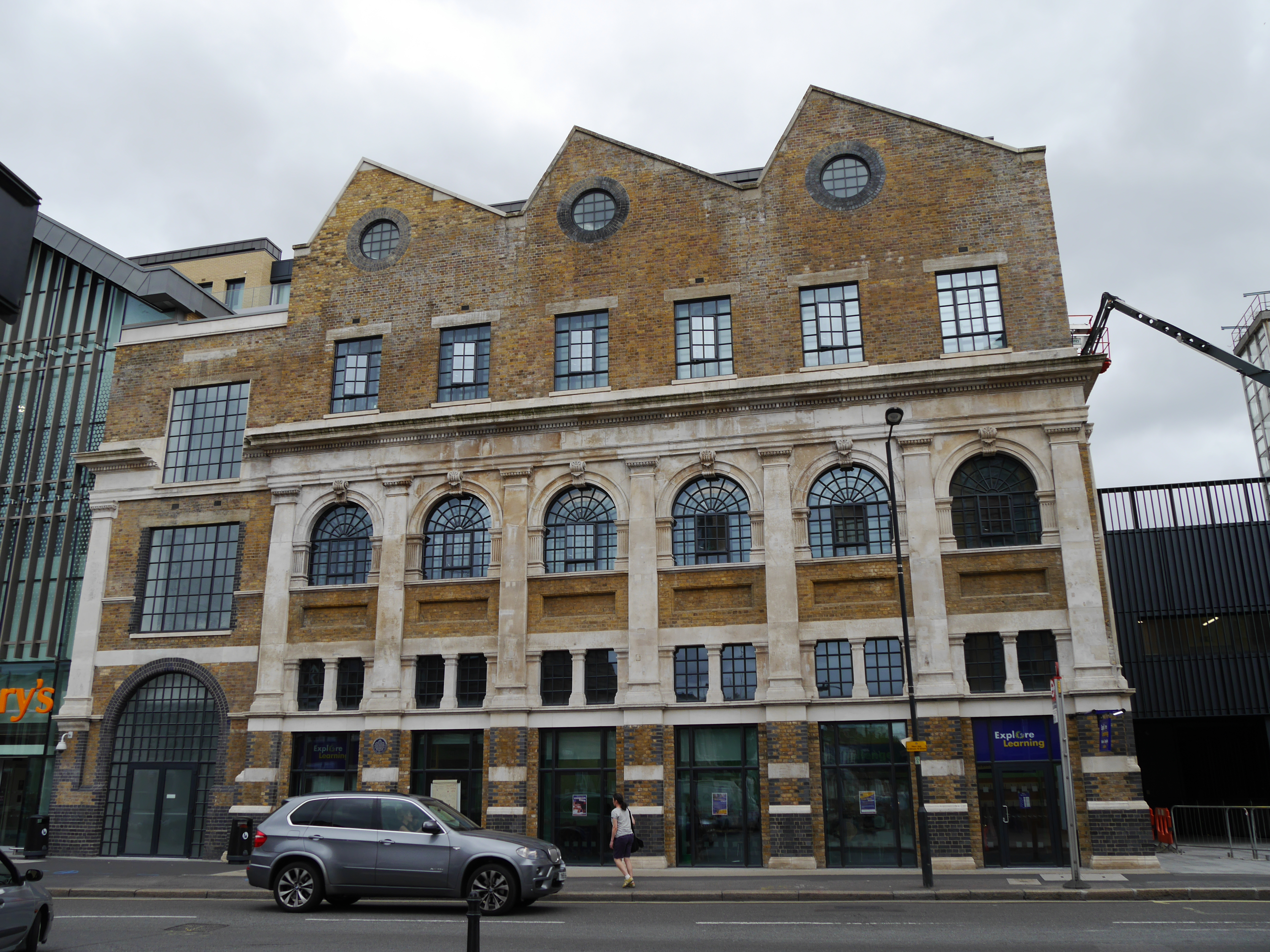
Kops Brewery, Sands End

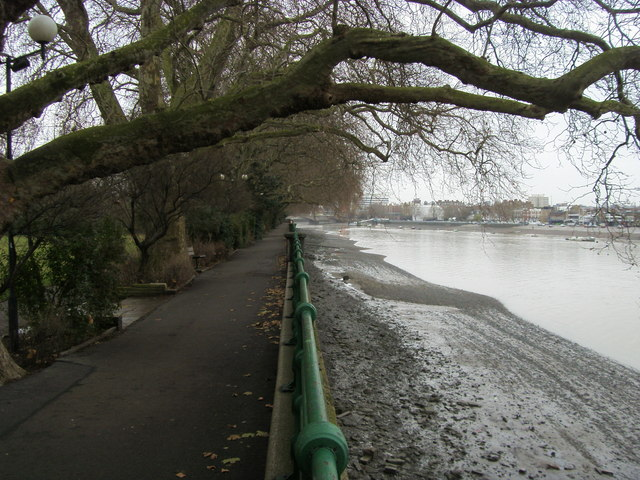
River Thames by Bishop's Park

== Bibliography ==
- The Fulham and Hammersmith Historical Society, now merged with the Fulham Society, has a number of publications about the locality: "Publications". Fhhs.wordpress.com. 3 January 2008. Archived from the original on 2 February 2017.
- Thomas Faulkner (1777-1855), An Historical and topographical account of Fulham; including the hamlet of Hammersmith. 1813. RCIN 1077212: "Thomas Faulkner (1777-1855) - An Historical and topographical account of Fulham; including the hamlet of Hammersmith / by T. Faulkner". Royalcollection.org.uk. Archived from the original on 30 July 2017.
- Corwin, Elizabeth (2024). The Lillie Enclave, North End, Fulham, London. Countryside Books. ISBN 978-1-84674-431-0.
