= Lillie Road =

Street in Fulham, London

Coordinates: 51°29′15″N 0°11′44″W

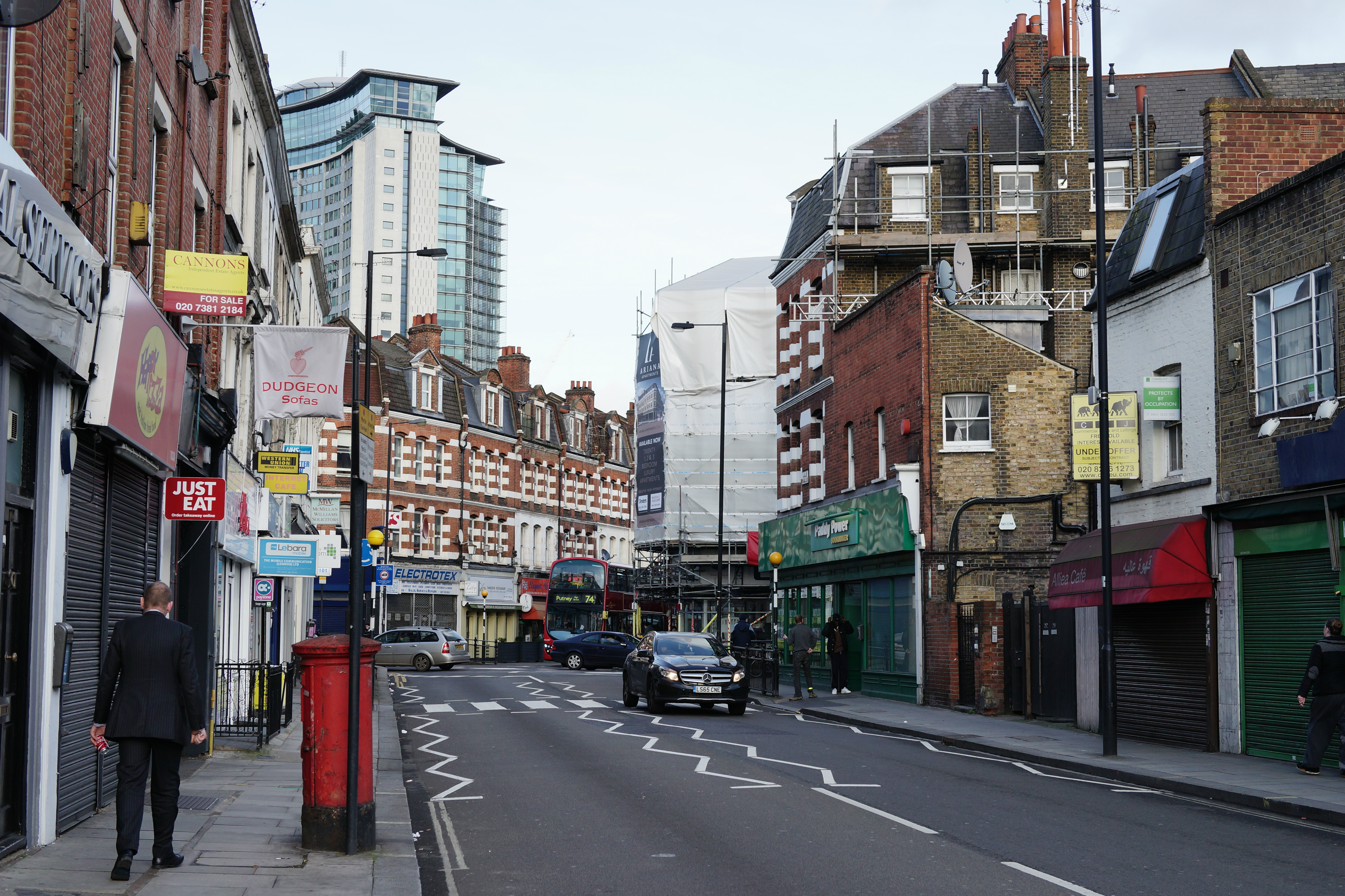
Lillie Road, looking east

Lillie Road is a major street in the north of Fulham, in the London Borough of Hammersmith and Fulham. Named for the Peninsular War veteran, John Scott Lillie, it is a mixed residential and commercial thoroughfare, and is the westerly continuation of the Old Brompton Road, the A3218 road, running from Lillie Bridge to the A219 Fulham Palace Road. Its main junctions are with North End Road and with Munster Road at Fulham Cross.

== History ==
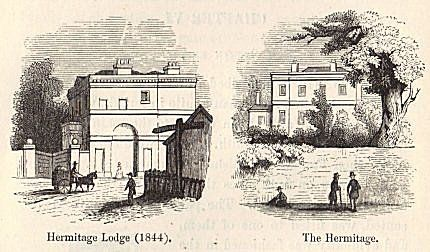
The Hermitage and Lodge, c. 1840

The road is named after Sir John Scott Lillie (1790–1868), who first laid out the easternmost section of the road across his North End Hermitage estate in 1826 running from Gunter's footbridge over the tidal Counter's Creek to the T junction of the old Crown Lane with North End Lane. The intention was to link traffic from the new Hammersmith Bridge with the North End wharves of the planned Kensington Canal, thus obviating passage through Hammersmith and Kensington, or following the entire loop of the River Thames to Chelsea. Lillie's development also included late Georgian housing, terraces called, 'Rosa Villas' and 'Hermitage Cottages', on the north side of his 'New' road, some of which remain and recall Hermitage House that once stood here. He also built a brewery on the opposite side of the road in 1832. Only its 1835 public house, 'The Lillie Arms' remains, renamed the Lillie Langtry, due to the surmise that the Jersey actress had her assignations with the future Edward VII in one of the Georgian houses in Lillie Road. The Lillie Langtry is one of the oldest extant pubs in Fulham, while the 1883 Prince of Wales, opposite, rebuilt by Watney Combe & Reid in the Arts and Crafts style in 1938, is destined for imminent demolition, unlike the former Fuller's Seven Stars, West Kensington, around the North End Road corner, also from 1938, which has been preserved as flats.

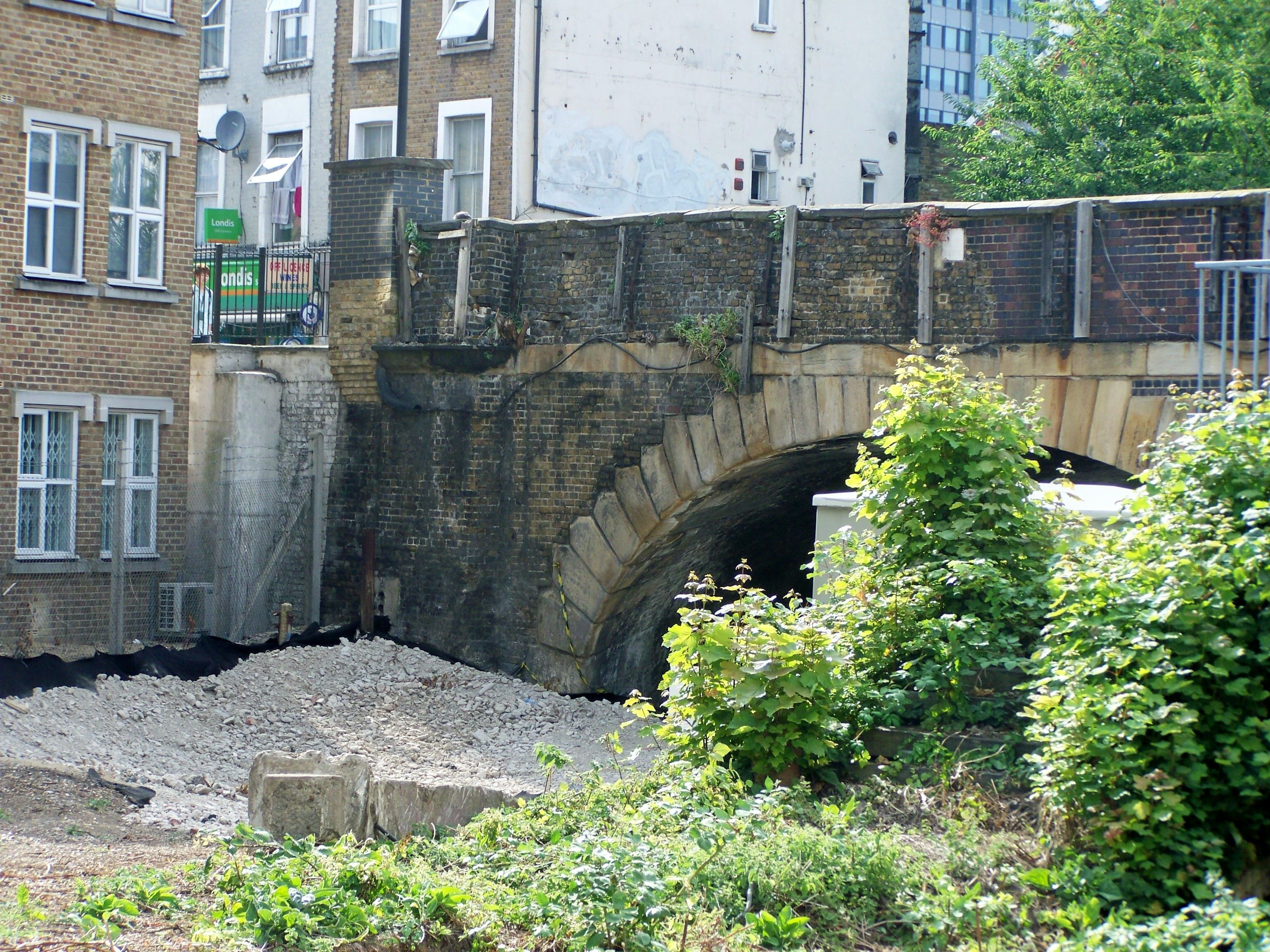
Remaining arch of the 1826 Kensington Canal bridge

Lillie Road is historically associated with the eponymous bridge over the West London Line, the Lillie Bridge Grounds, a popular 19th-century sports destination, with the Lillie Bridge Depot, the London Underground maintenance workshops, the Sir John Lillie Primary School and, at its western extremity, with the Lillie Road Recreational Grounds, where Sunday league football has been played for generations. Lillie Road was formerly the address of Beaufort School which commemorated Beaufort House and the South Middlesex Rifle Volunteers. There are a number of statutorily and locally listed buildings in Lillie Road.

A little known resident of 62 Lillie Road was the specialised builder and decorator Joseph Bickley (1835–1923). He ran his business from Seagrave Road nearby and patented a plaster formula which became the mainstay of indoor tennis and Real tennis courts throughout Britain and in the United States (such as that at the Tuxedo Club). Its main virtue was to withstand condensation and damp. His courts, and courts he was consulted about, survive to this day, at Petworth House, Jesmond Dene House, Moreton Morrell, Queen's Club and at Hampton Court Palace. He faced bankruptcy proceedings in 1913 when he was in his late 70s. Described as the 'Stradivarius' of the indoor court, he took his secrets with him to the grave.

== Commerce ==
Much of Lillie Road - with the exception of the blighted eastern end - retains some of Fulham's old character and individuality through the presence of small shops and businesses, that include upholstering and picture framing, a famous toy shop, along with a collection of antique shops by Fulham Cross.

== Transport ==
=== Railways ===
West Brompton station is at the eastern commencement of Lillie Road serving the London Underground's District line as well as London Overground services. This station also serves Southern services, running between East Croydon, and Watford Junction.

=== Buses ===
Bus routes 28, 74, 190, 211, 295, 424 and 430 run along the road, with the 74 and 430 traversing the entire length of the road. The 190 begins its journey to Richmond at the Empire State Building, which is on the road, with the 211, 295 and 424 only running part of the route (from the A3219 Munster Road to the A219 Fulham Palace Road).

== Places of interest ==
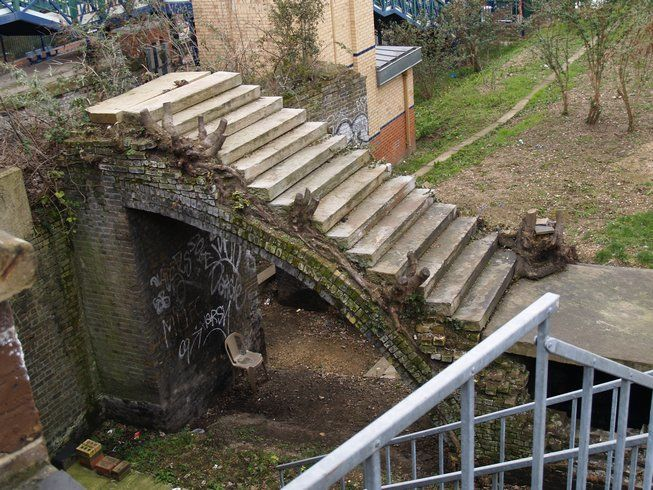
1826 steps to Kensington Canal basin, Fulham

- Lillie Bridge with vestige of 1826 Kensington Canal bridge and steps to canal basin and wharves.
- John Young's Mid-Victorian Empress Place, former access to Earl's Court Pleasure Gardens
- Lillie Yard recording studio
- Empress State Building
- Metropolitan Police Service Heritage Centre
- Ibis London exhibition centre
- Normand Park
- Fulham Pools
- Twynholm Baptist Church
- Bishop Creighton Community Centre

== Gallery ==
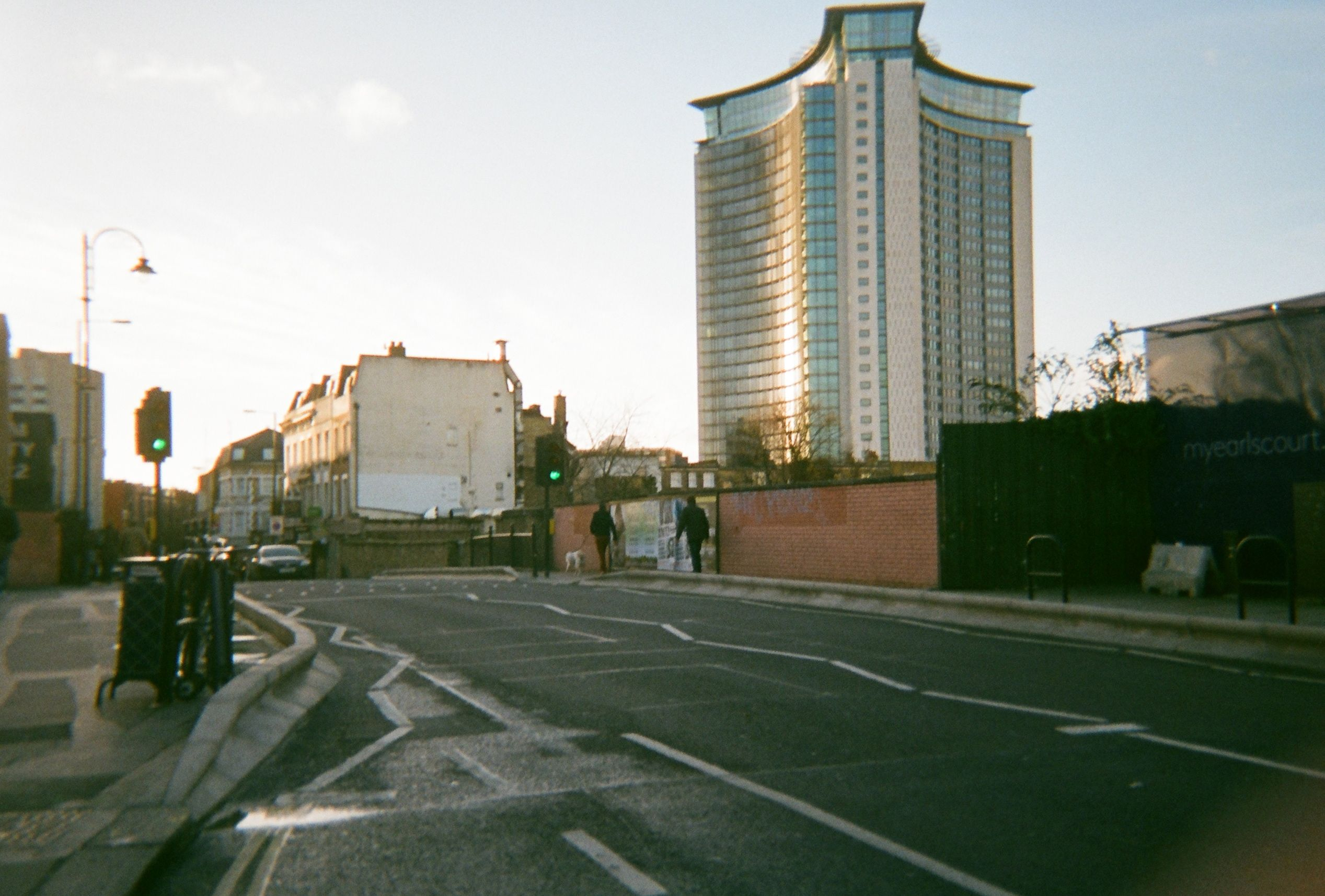
Entry into Lillie Road from the east

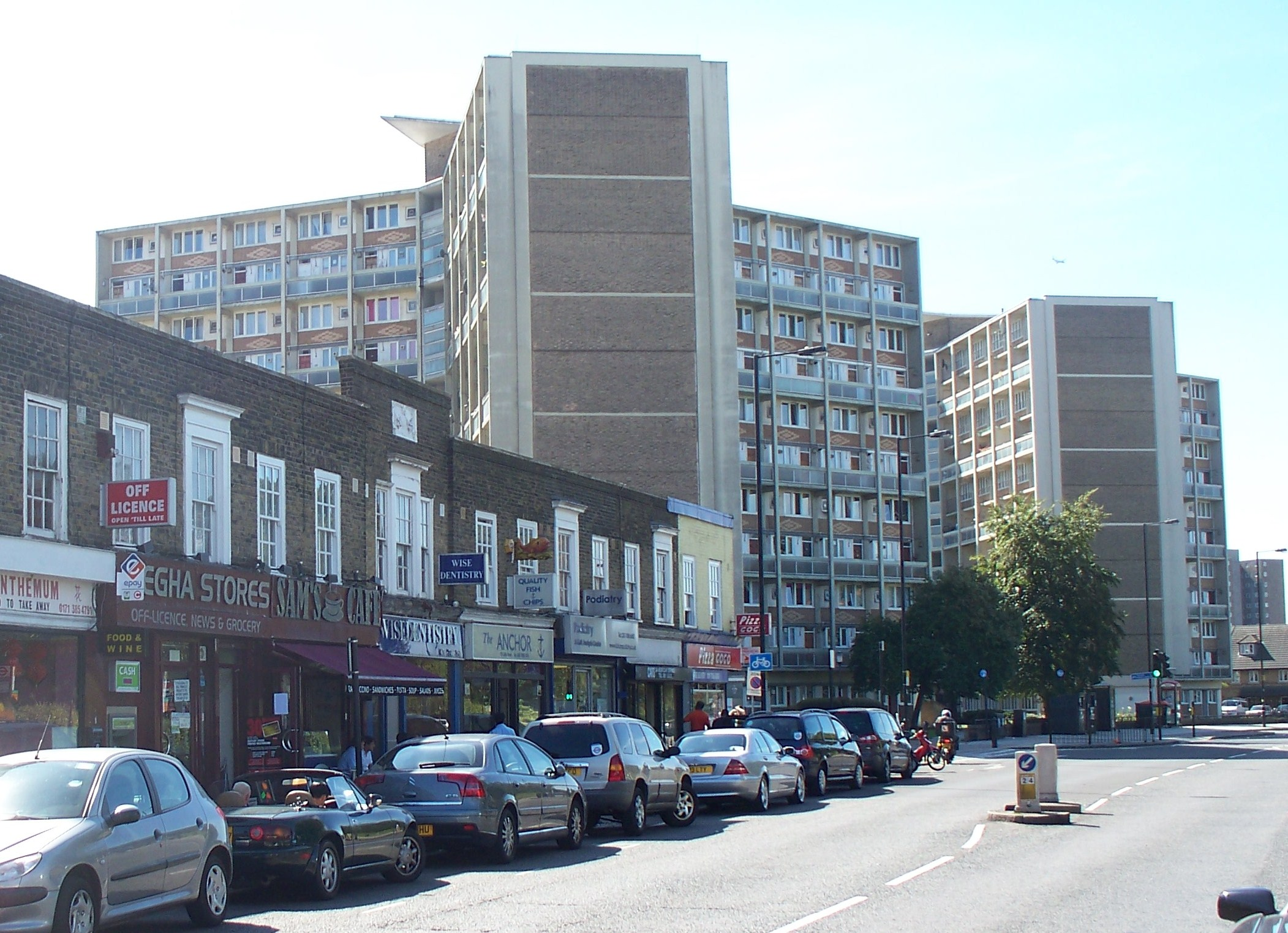
Shop parade in Lillie Road

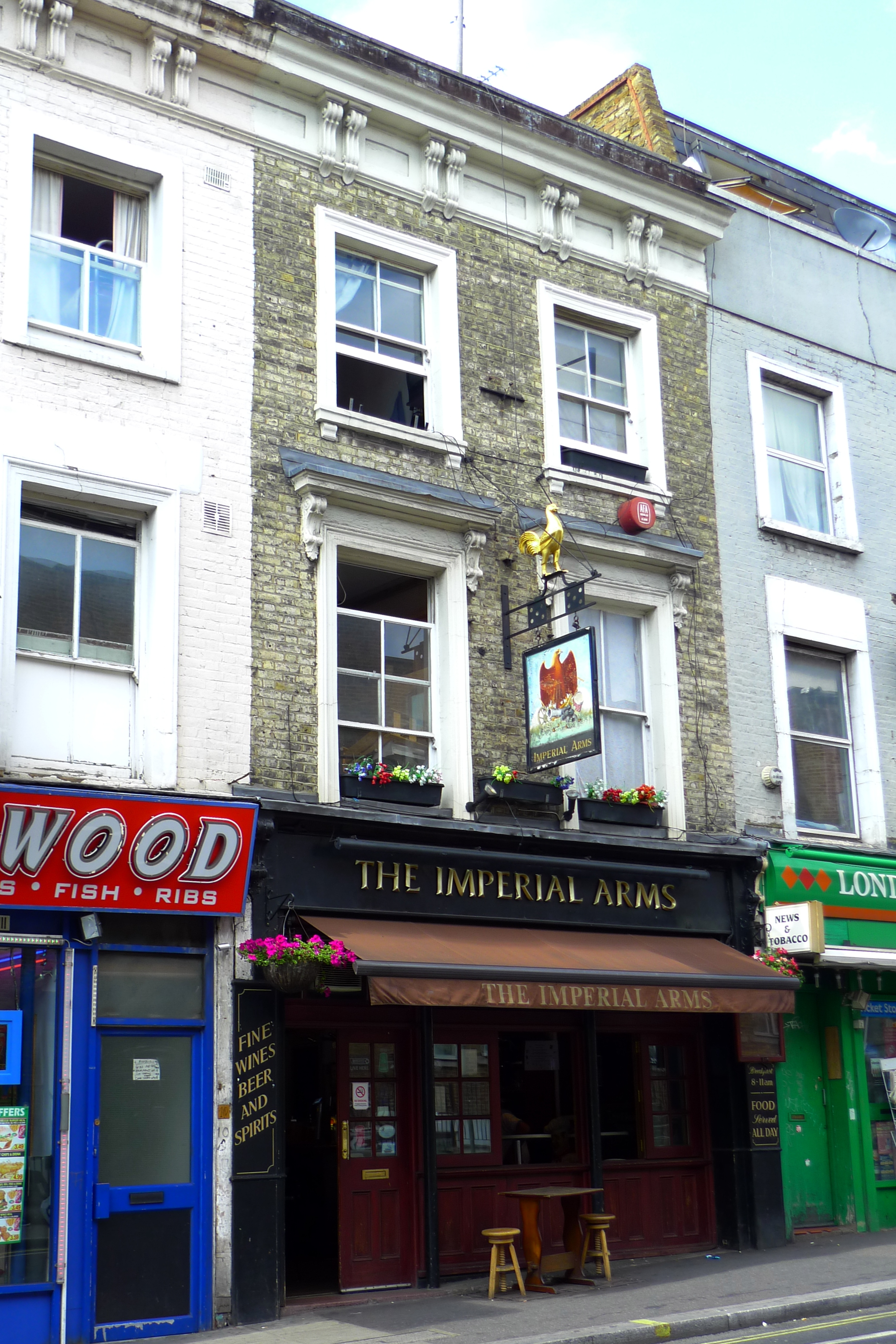
The Imperial Arms, 8 Lillie Road

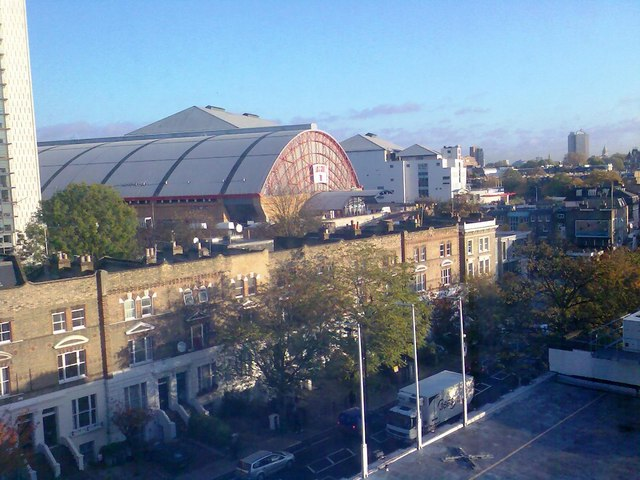
Lillie Road skyline eastwards with Mid-Victorian terrace

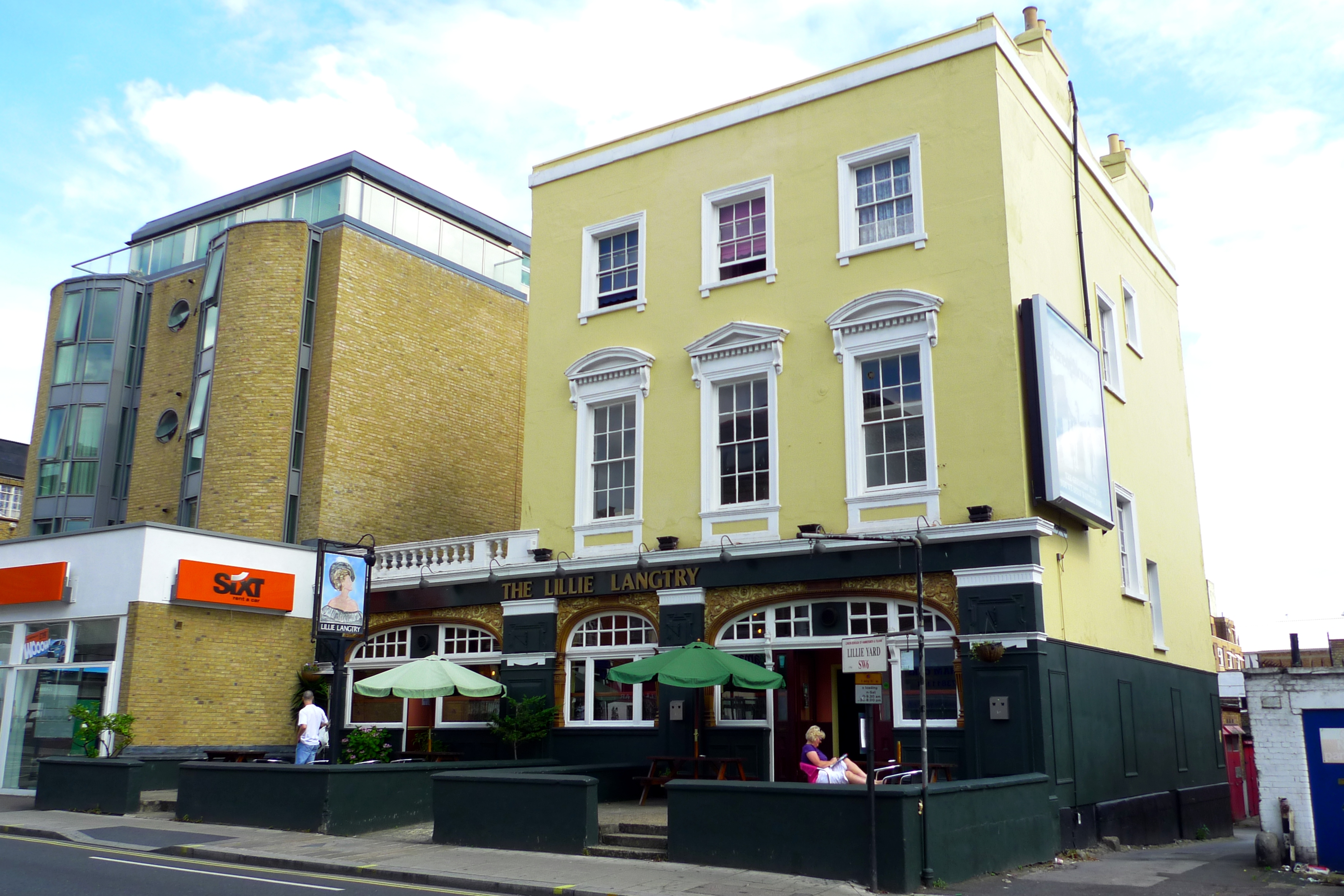
The Lillie Langtry pub (Former Lillie Arms, 1835)

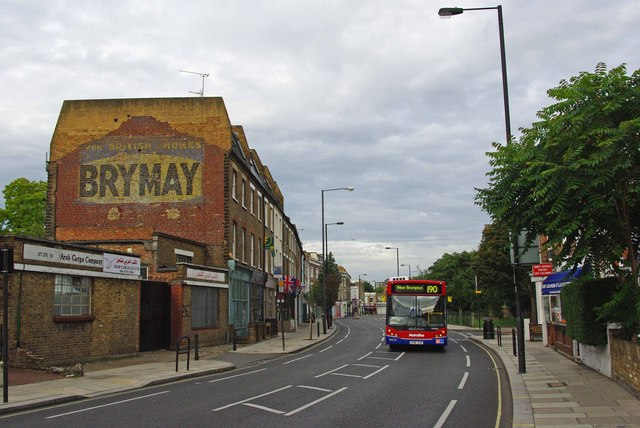
Coming east from Fulham Cross

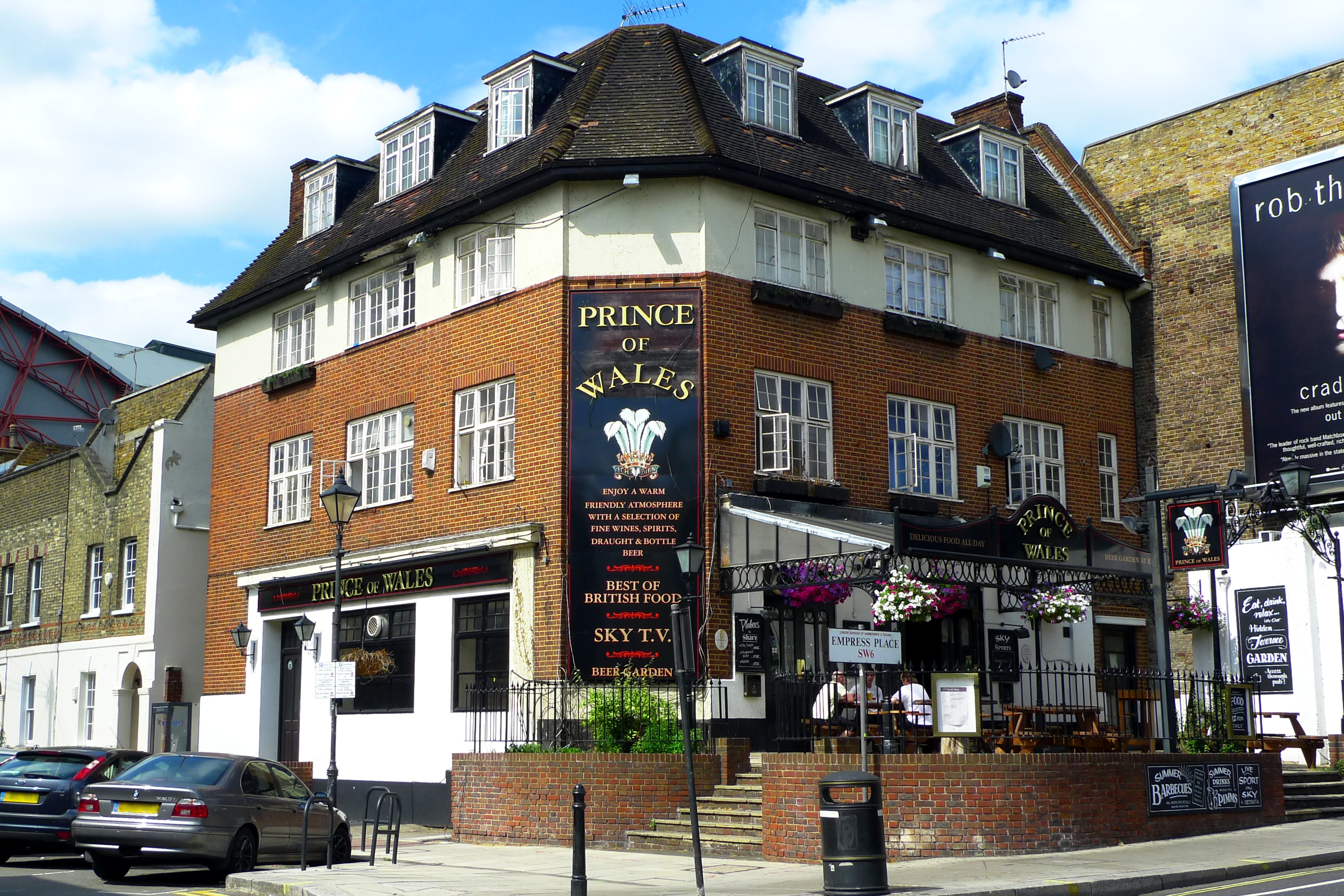
The Prince of Wales, 12 Lillie Road, a Chelsea supporters haunt

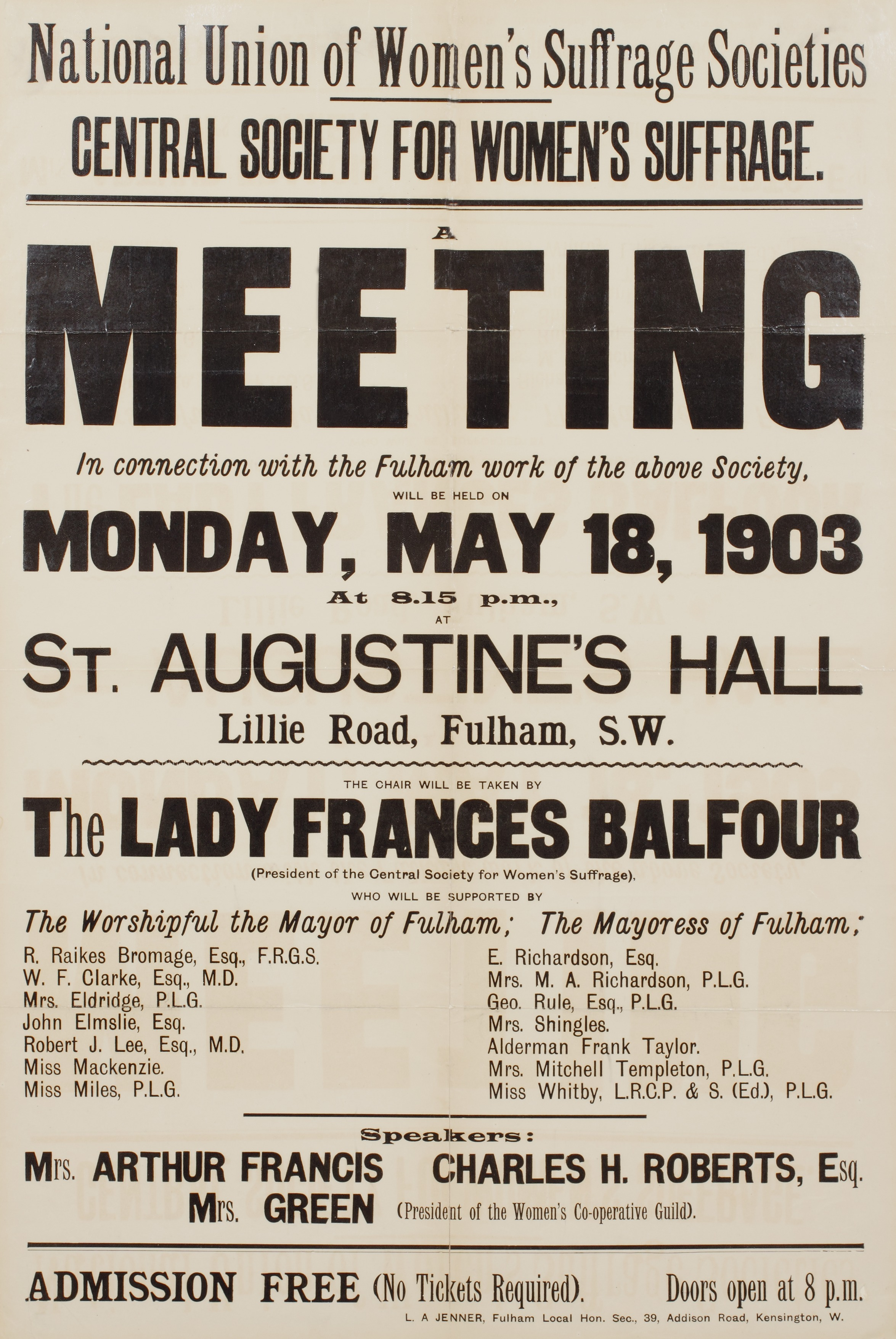
1903 Suffrage poster for meeting in Lillie Road

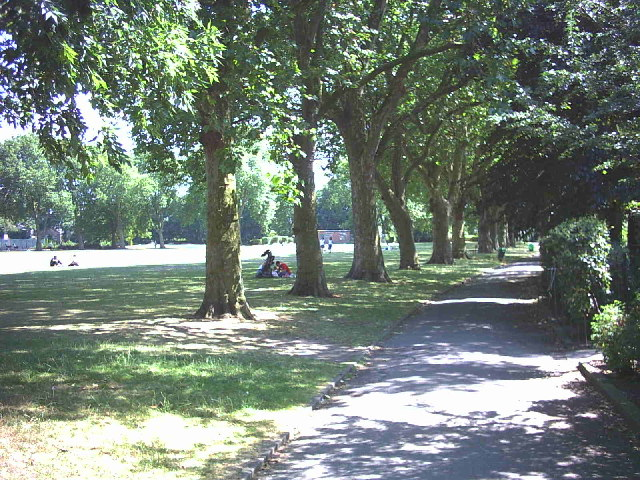
Lillie Road Recreation Ground

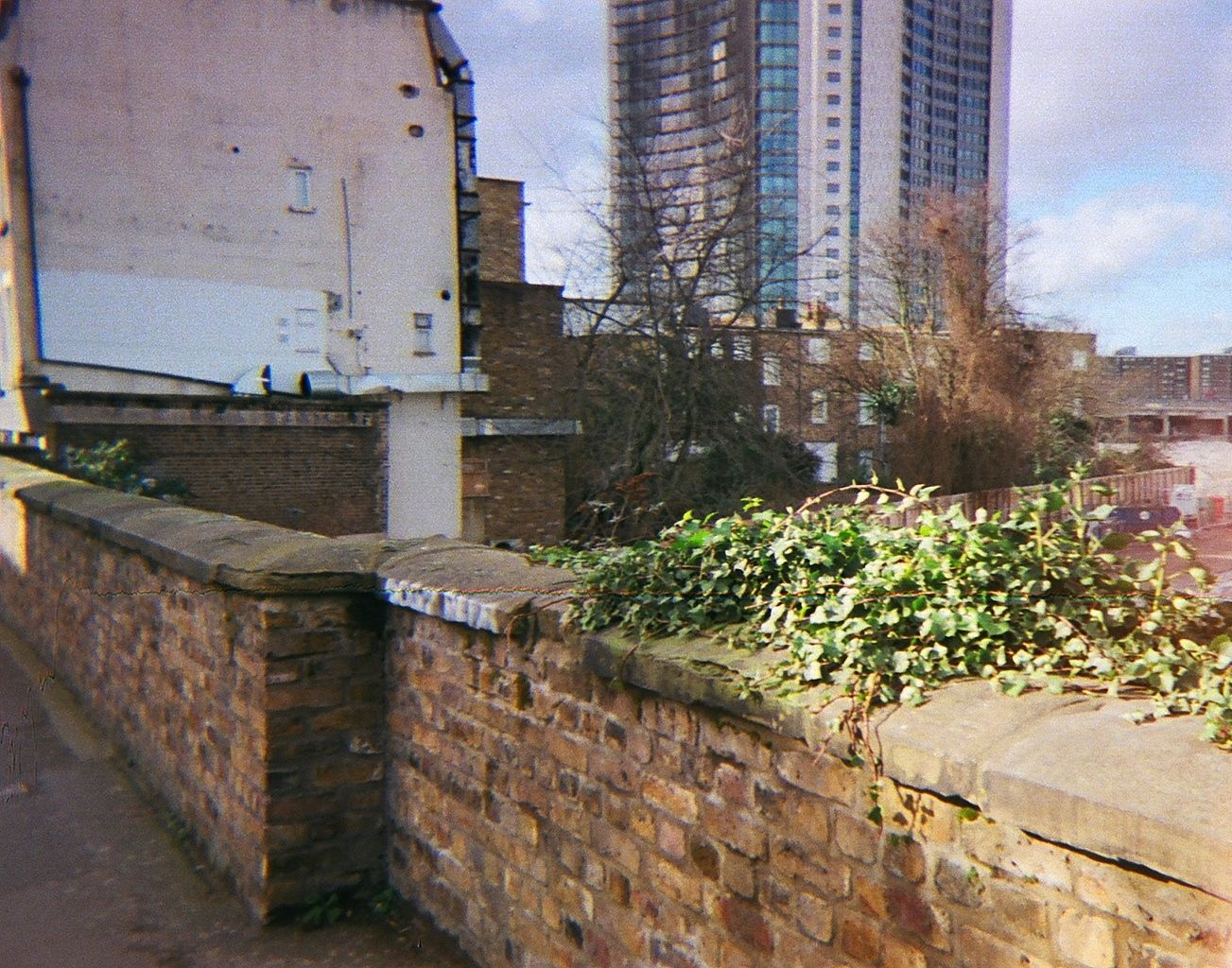
Empress State Building

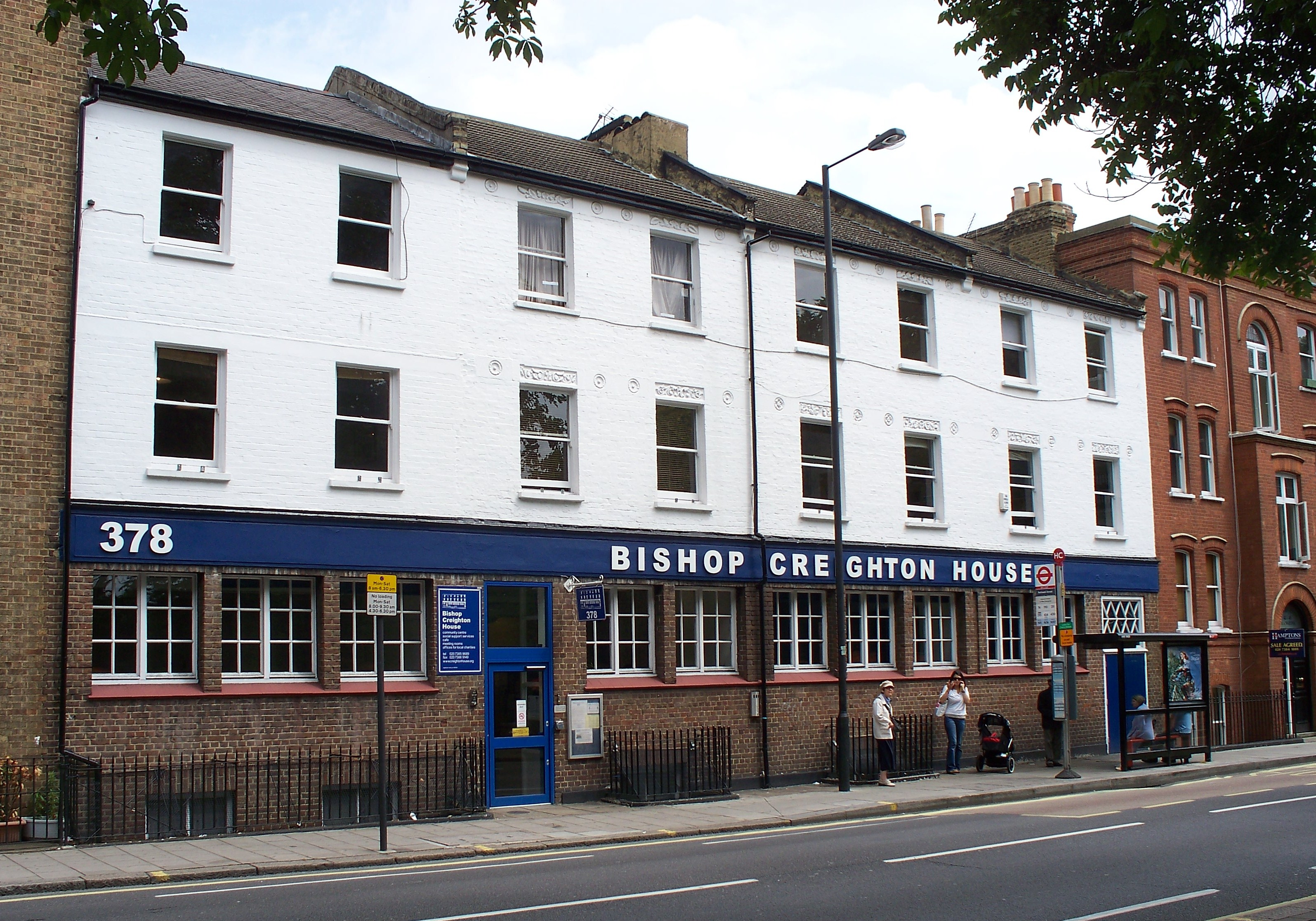
Bishop Creighton House, Lillie Road

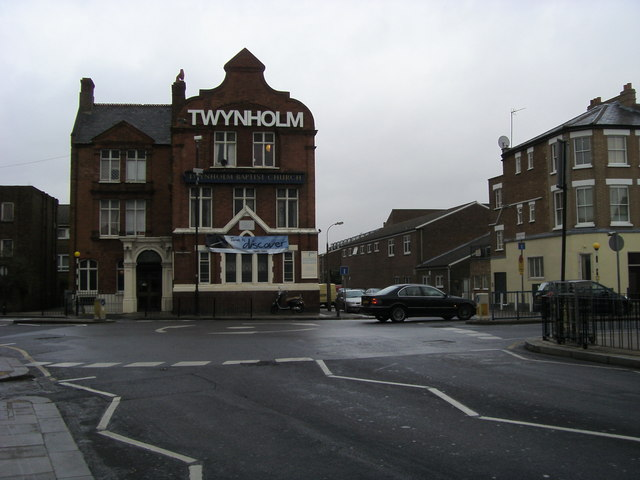
Twynholm Baptist Church, Lillie Road
