= North End, Fulham =

Former village in Middlesex, England

Coordinates: 51°29′27″N 0°12′25″W

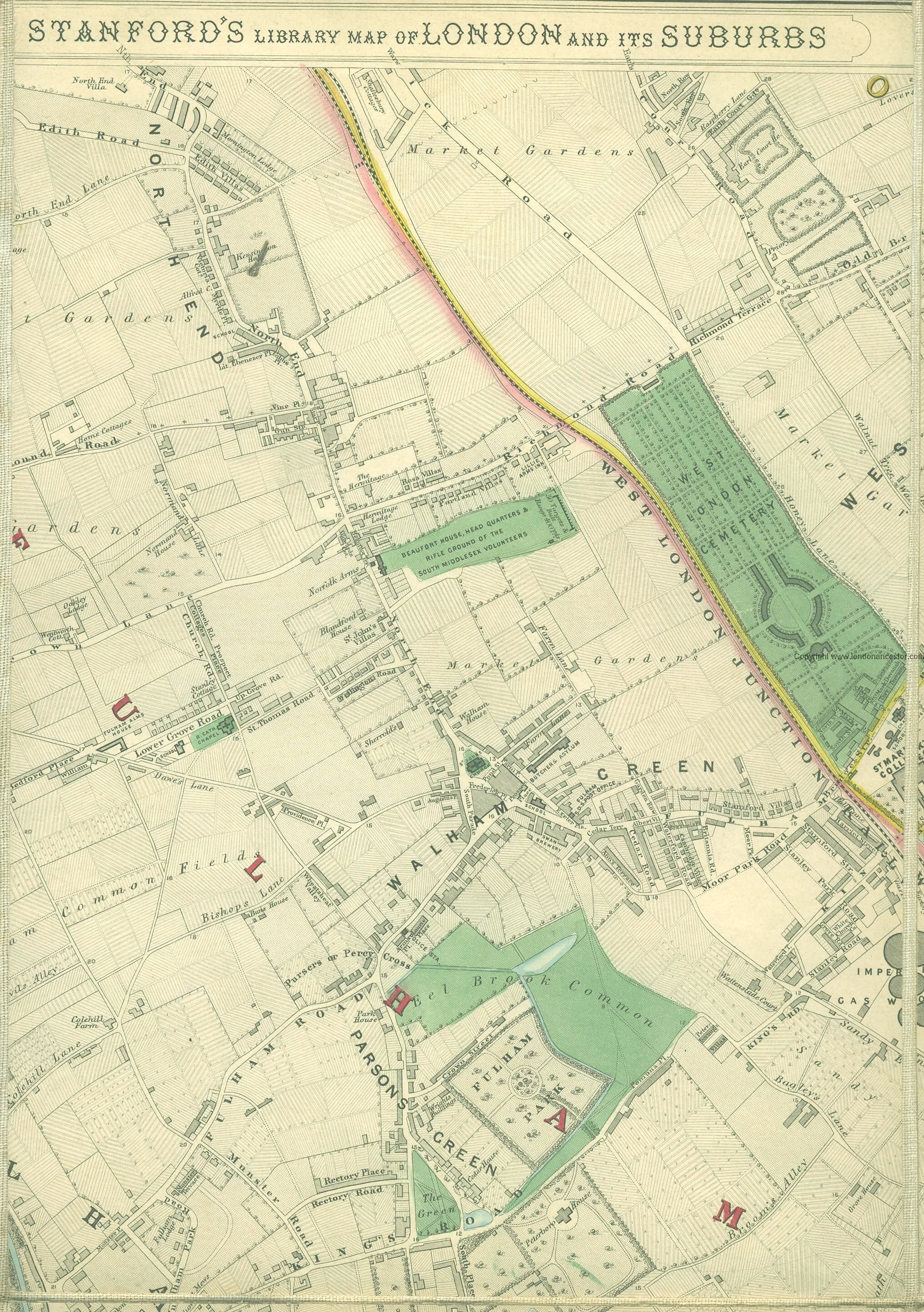
1862 Stanford map showing North End

North End was, until the last quarter of the 19th-century, a scattered hamlet among the fields and market gardens, between Counter's Creek and Walham Green in the Parish of Fulham in the County of Middlesex.

In connection with the development of the Kensington Canal on the northern boundary of Fulham parish, Sir John Scott Lillie built the 'North End Brewery' complex in 1832. The attached public house was called the 'Lillie Arms' (today's Lillie Langtry in Lillie Road, misnamed later for an alleged local connection with the Jersey socialite) and had a frontage of 140 feet along the newly laid out road running from Lillie Bridge (Fulham) to North End Lane. According to Féret the landlady was a Miss Goslin. All that remains of North End in memory is the North End Road, Fulham. In the 1880s, the area became known as "West Kensington", at the request of developers Gibbs and Flew who were having trouble selling their newly built houses in a Fulham backwater. West Kensington tube station on the Metropolitan District Railway, was originally called 'Fulham - North End'.

== Notable residents ==
- Samuel Richardson
- Samuel Foote
- Francesco Bartolozzi
- Benjamin Rawlinson Faulkner
- Thomas Elliot Harrison
- Edmund Kean
- Sir John Scott Lillie
- Arthur Lillie
- Edward Burne-Jones
- Georgiana Burne-Jones
- William Hurlstone
