= Seven Stars, West Kensington =

Pub in West Kensington, London, England

Coordinates: 51.4871°N 0.2031°W

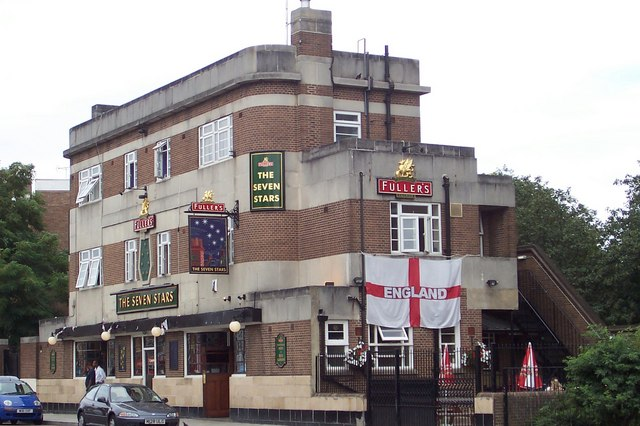
The Seven Stars, 2006

The Seven Stars is a former Fuller's pub at 253 North End Road, West Kensington, London.

It was rebuilt in 1938 with a typical art deco facade, designed by John Nowell Parr, son of the famous pub architect T. H. Nowell Parr. However, there has been a pub on the site since at least the 19th century.

In 2009, it was sold by Fuller's to a developer, and closed in 2010.

Since 2013, it has been a student hostel, Yara Central, Kensington, owned by Yara Capital Ltd, with 24 studio rooms available to rent.
