= Lillie Rec =

Park in London, England

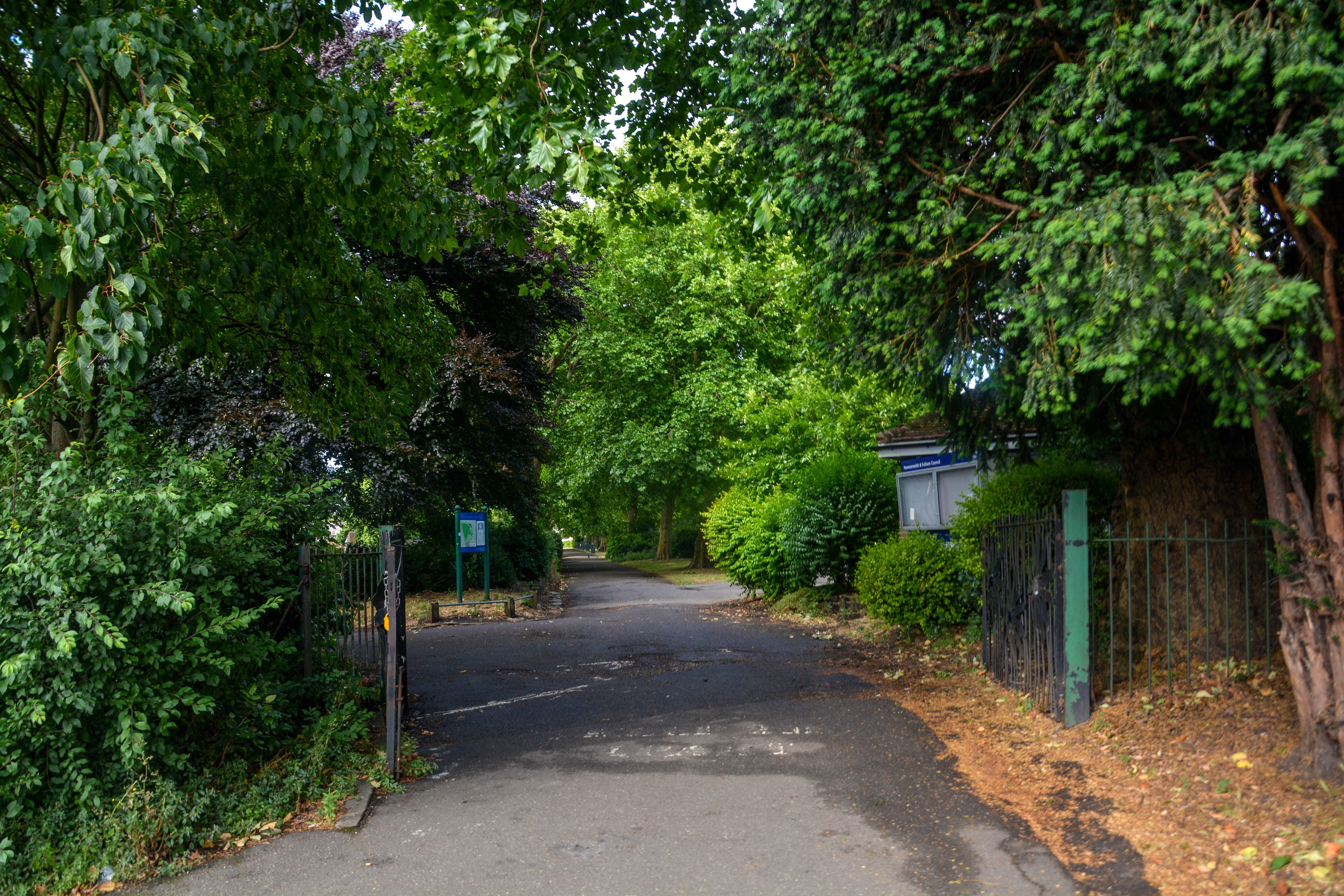
Lillie Road Recreation Ground in June 2022.

Lillie Rec (proper name Lillie Road Recreational Ground), is a park located in London Borough of Hammersmith and Fulham, 0.8 mile (1.25 km) south of Hammersmith tube station, and at the junction of Lillie Road and Fulham Palace Road.

== History ==
Lillie Road Recreational Ground, was developed further in the 1970s, as part of the Fulham Riverside redevelopment, adding play equipment, and raising some beds.

== Sports events ==
Lille Rec regularly holds amateur sports matches, especially football. Lillie Rec is the location of the West London Wildcats, an AFL club, Winter Preseason, held from January to April.

Lillie Rec can also be booked for cricket games, housing cricket pitches, during the Summer Months.

== Community events ==
The Rec, regularly hosts community events, such as fetes, and workshops. In June 2025, a family fete was hosted, including craft workshops, and games.
