= Arthur Lillie =

British writer

Arthur Lillie (24 February 1831 – 28 November 1911), was a Buddhist, soldier in the British Indian Army, and a writer.

== Biography ==
Lillie, christened as George Arthur Howard, was the youngest son of Sir John Scott Lillie and his wife Louisa, born at North End, Fulham. He was an officer in the British Indian Army. While in India, he became a Buddhist. His books on religion were poorly received by scholars. Lillie appears to have written the original rule book for a Scottish croquet tournament, which, if so, continues to be his best-received work.

Arthur Lillie also took an enthusiastic interest in Gospel of the Hebrews. In Buddhism in Christendom Or Jesus the Essene he wrote

At any rate the account of the last supper in the Gospel of the Hebrews was manifestly quite different from the accounts given in our present gospels. There we see nothing about James drinking out of Christ's cup, a fact which proves that the contents of the cup must have been water, for St. James was bound by the vow of the Nazarite to drink water for life.

He was critical of the claims of Helena Blavatsky and the Theosophical Society. He believed that Blavatsky had faked the Mahatma letters and was a plagiarist.

Lillie became a landscape painter and joined the Suffolk painters. He remained a bachelor and, when in England, shared a household, first with his widowed aunt, Alicia Bunbury, and then with his unmarried sister, Louisa. He died in Kensington in 1911, aged 80.

== Books ==
- Buddha and early Buddhism (1881)
- The Popular Life of Buddha: Containing an Answer to the "Hibbert Lectures" of 1881 (1883)
- Buddhism in Christendom, Or, Jesus, the Essene (1887)
- The Cobra Diamond: [a novel] (1890)
- The Influence of Buddhism on Primitive Christianity (1893)
- Madame Blavatsky and Her "theosophy": A Study (1895)
- Croquet: Its History, Rules, and Secrets. (1897)
- Croquet Up to Date: Containing the Ideas and Teachings of the Leading Players and Champions (1900)
- India in Primitive Christianity (1909)
- Râma and Homer: An Argument that in the Indian Epics Homer Found the Theme of His Two Great Poems (1912)
- Gospel of the Hebrews 30 page article extracted from Influence of Buddhism on Primitive Christianity 1893 by Kessinger Publishing and listed as 2005.
