= Lillie Bridge (Fulham) =

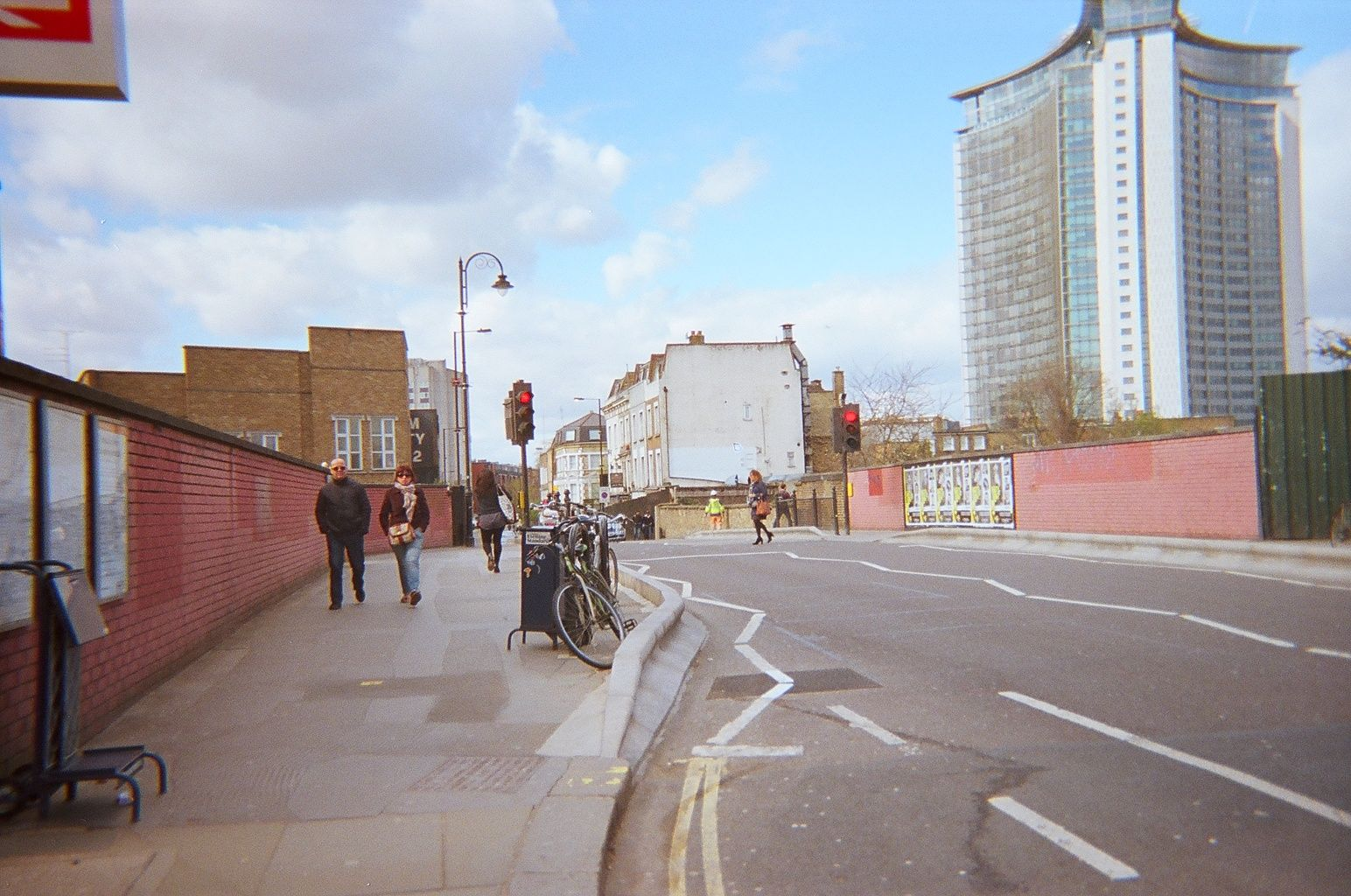
- Lillie Bridge from West Brompton station
- Coordinates: 51°29′N 0°12′W
- Carries: A3218 road
- Crosses: West London Line
- Locale: London, England, United Kingdom

Characteristics
- Design: Road bridge
- Material: Steel and brick

History
- Designer: Sir John Fowler, 1st Baronet
- Opened: 1860

Location
- Interactive map of Lillie Bridge

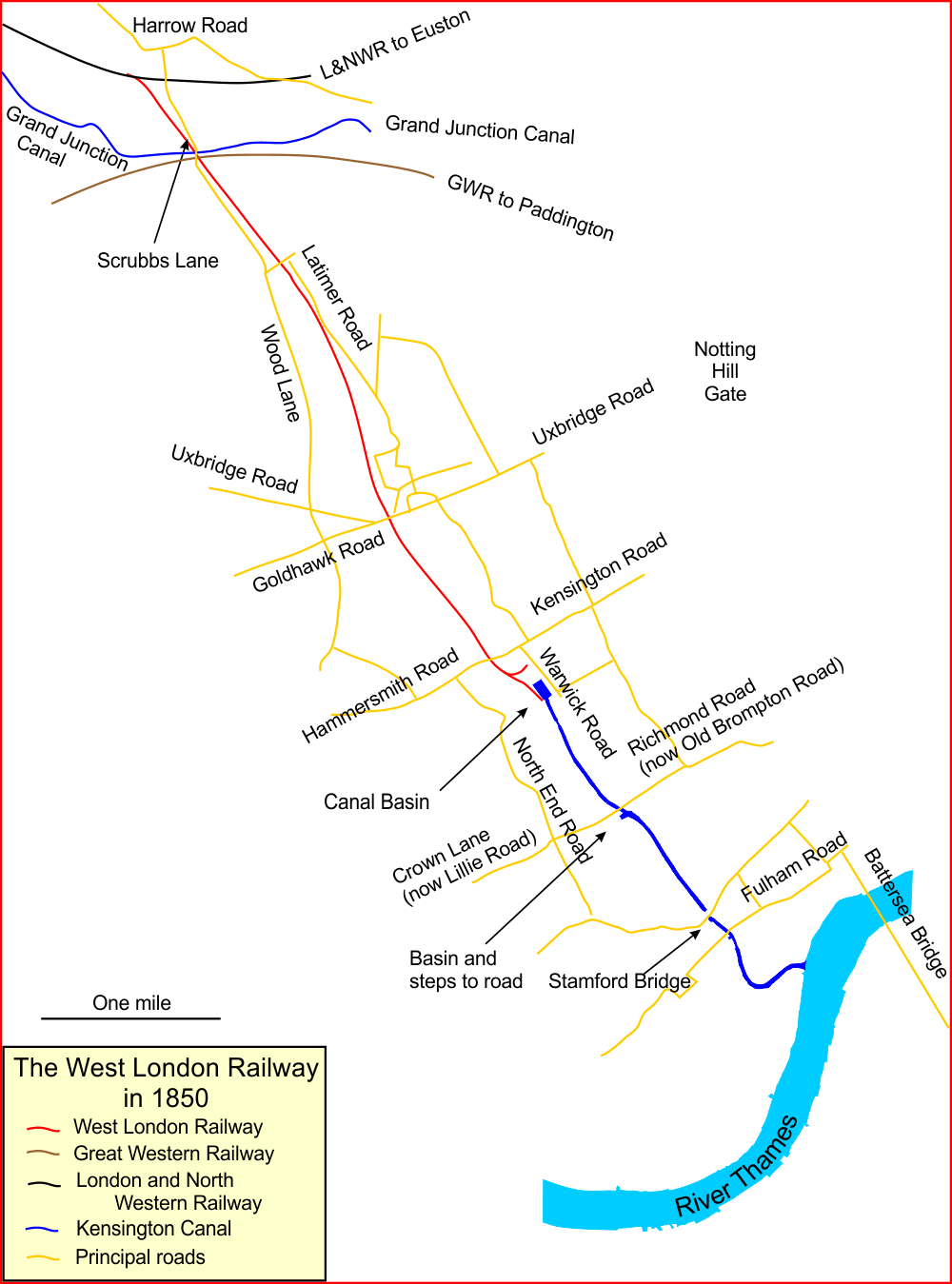
West London Railway 1850, indicating the extant steps to basin at Lillie Bridge

Lillie Bridge is a road bridge that links Old Brompton Road in the Royal Borough of Kensington and Chelsea with Lillie Road in the London Borough of Hammersmith & Fulham. It crosses two railways: the West London Line on the London Overground and the Wimbledon branch of the London Underground at West Brompton station.

== History ==
Its history goes back to at least the 18th century when there was a wooden foot-bridge, called 'Gunter's Bridge' after landowner and confectioner James Gunter (1731-1819), over a tributary of the River Thames, variously called Counter's Creek, or Counter's ditch (or sewer), that separated the parishes of Fulham and Kensington at this spot. A Magistrates' enquiry into the bridges of the County of Middlesex, set up in 1820, described it thus:

Footbridge of Wood called Gunter's Bridge in the Footpath between Earls Court and Walham Green. [...] This bridge has been built upwards of Fifty Years and is kept in repair at the joint expense of Kensington and Fulham Parishes. [...] The tide flows to a considerable distance above this Bridge.

A stone and brick structure was built in its place, when Counter's Creek was converted into the Kensington Canal in 1826. It opened for trade in 1828. Remnants of the bridge beneath the current road bridge are still visible from platform 4 on the Overground Line at the neighbouring station. The new bridge was subsequently named after Sir John Scott Lillie, the Peninsular War veteran and inventor and early 19th-century developer on the Fulham side, who was also involved with the canal project. Its railway associations go back to 1838 under the supervision of engineer, Robert Stephenson. The canal bridge was used to carry the road over the railway to the London and North Western Railway yard which had replaced the canal basin and wharves behind Reckitt Street, Fulham.

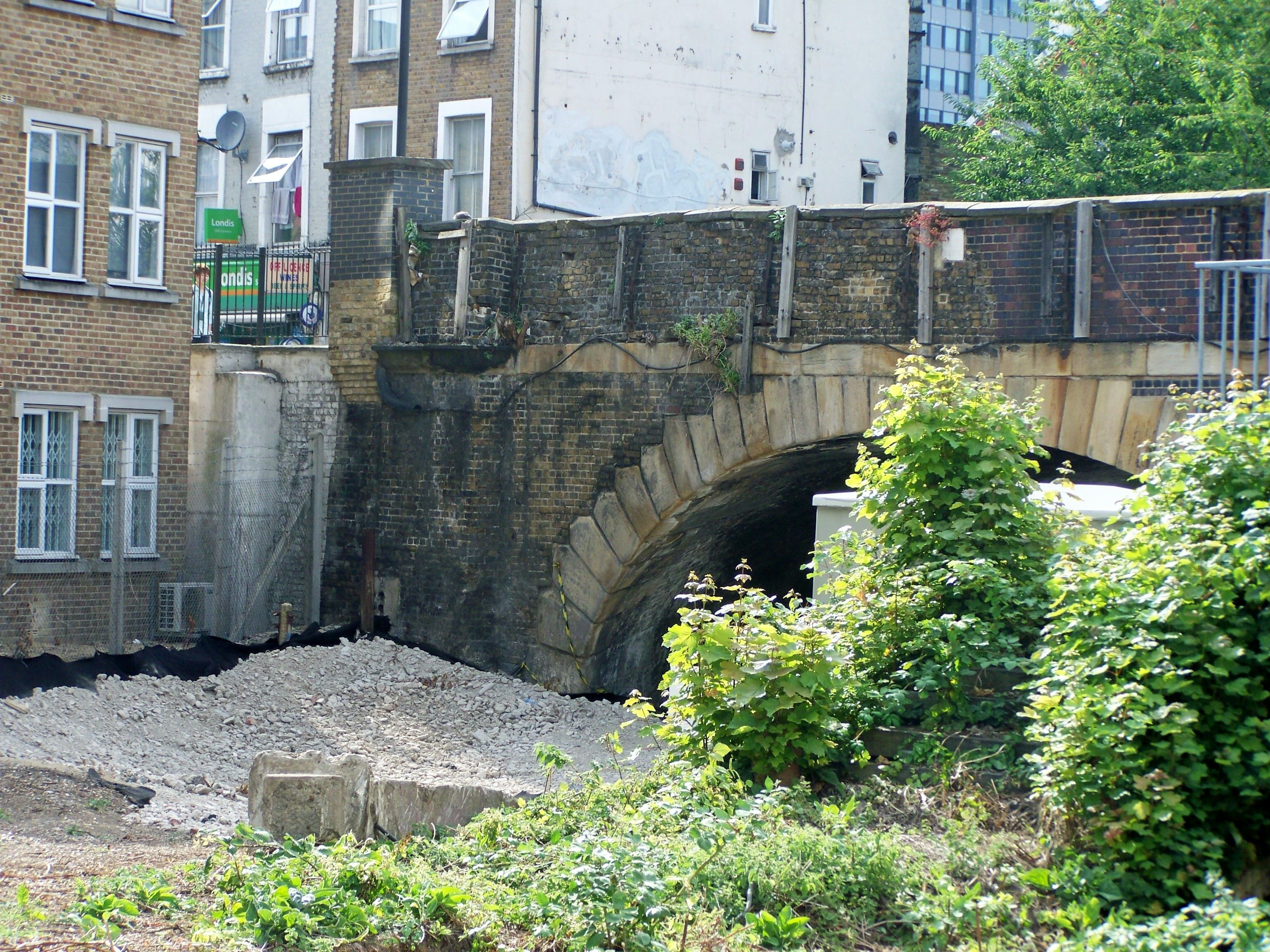
Remaining arch of 'Lillie' 's 1826 Kensington Canal bridge

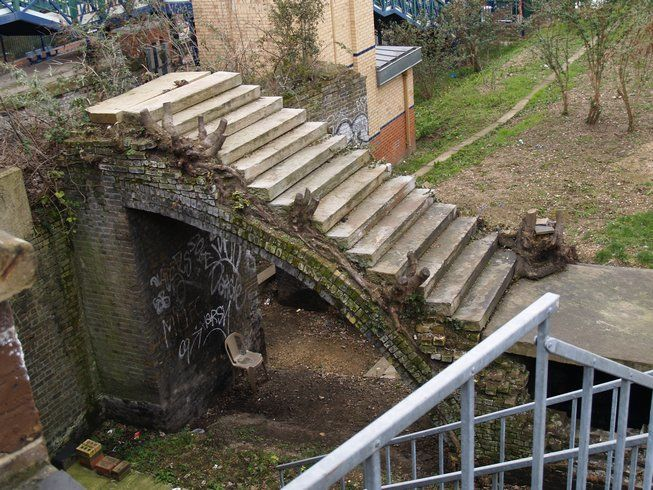
Steps onto 1826 Canal bridge at West Brompton, Fulham side

A new much enlarged road bridge was built over the stone and brick canal crossing in 1860 by the railway engineer, John Fowler in connection with his construction of the Grade II Listed West Brompton station. Since then. the bridge became known for the sporting venues to the south, as the 'Lillie Bridge Grounds' opened in 1869 and closed by arson and a riot in 1887. It was the scene of athletics, football and county cricket, as well as cycling and ballooning. To the north it has become associated with the eponymous Lillie Bridge Depot, built in 1871 as an engineering hub for the early railways and latterly, a maintenance centre for London Transport's tube network. Fowler's bridge has been lengthened and strengthened in ensuing years. The brickwork in the original parapets has been repaired but the four stone plaques commemorating the dates of re-building, from 1860 onwards, are retained in the present bridge. Both parapets were obscured for decades by tall advertising hoardings only taken down since 2012 for the Olympic Games, when Indoor volleyball was played at Earl's Court.

== Green corridor ==
In spite of repeated disturbance since the early 19th-century, with canal and railway building, the verges of the West London Line and the proximity of Brompton Cemetery and the town gardens of Empress Place in Fulham, had ensured the survival of a rich biodiversity in the area of the bridge. Most notably there is a pond, remnant of the ever-present Counter's Creek, along platform 4 of West Brompton station on the Fulham side. The pond and its acre of 'scrub' was, until 5 years ago, supervised by the erstwhile Railtrack and local volunteers from Fulham Groundwork UK. The defunct London Ecology Unit produced in 1993 an audit of the flora and fauna to be found here. There are said to have been 140 species of flora. In 2016 the Bee Friendly Trust installed on platform 2 of the District line at West Brompton station, a number of flower boxes to attract pollinating insects.

== Future prospects ==
Lillie Bridge, along with the borough boundary, the natural 'Green corridor' and built heritage, are scheduled to disappear in the regeneration plans for the Earls Court Exhibition Centre site.

== Gallery ==
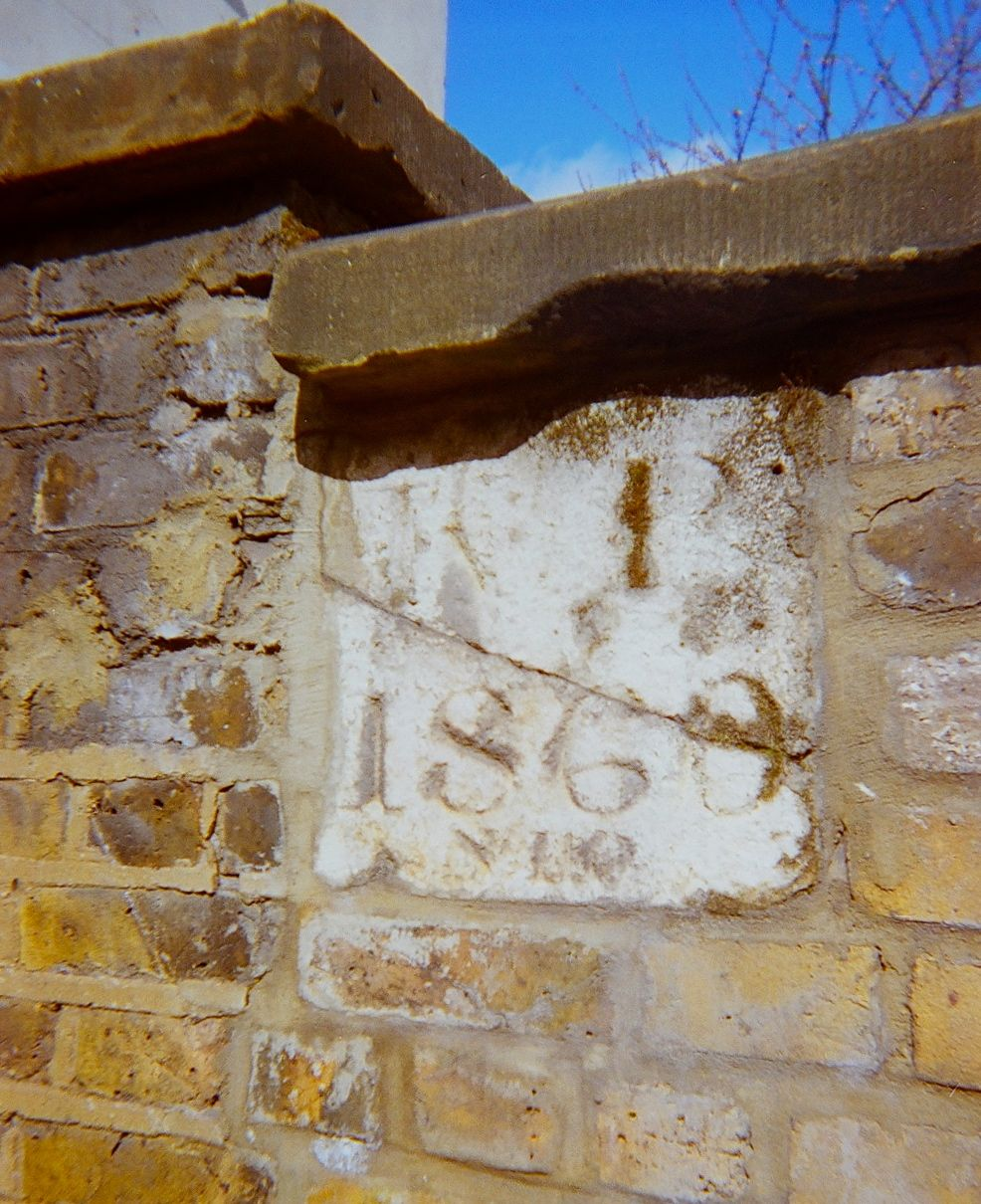
1860 stone plaque on Lillie Bridge, Fulham

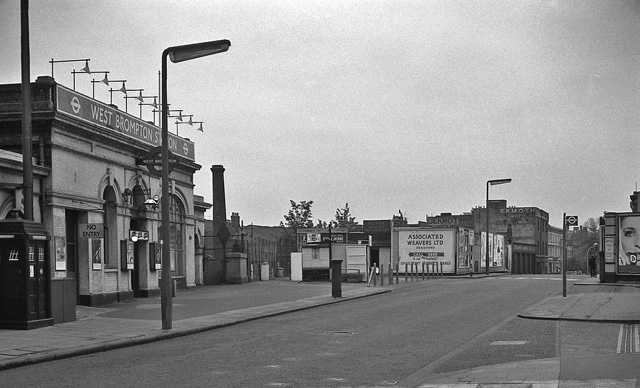
On the right, Lillie Bridge obscured by advertising hoardings in 1963

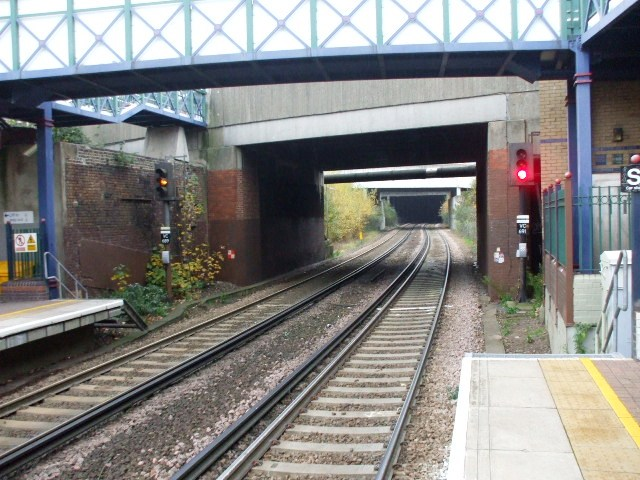
The West London Line passing under Lillie Bridge towards Kensington (Olympia) station

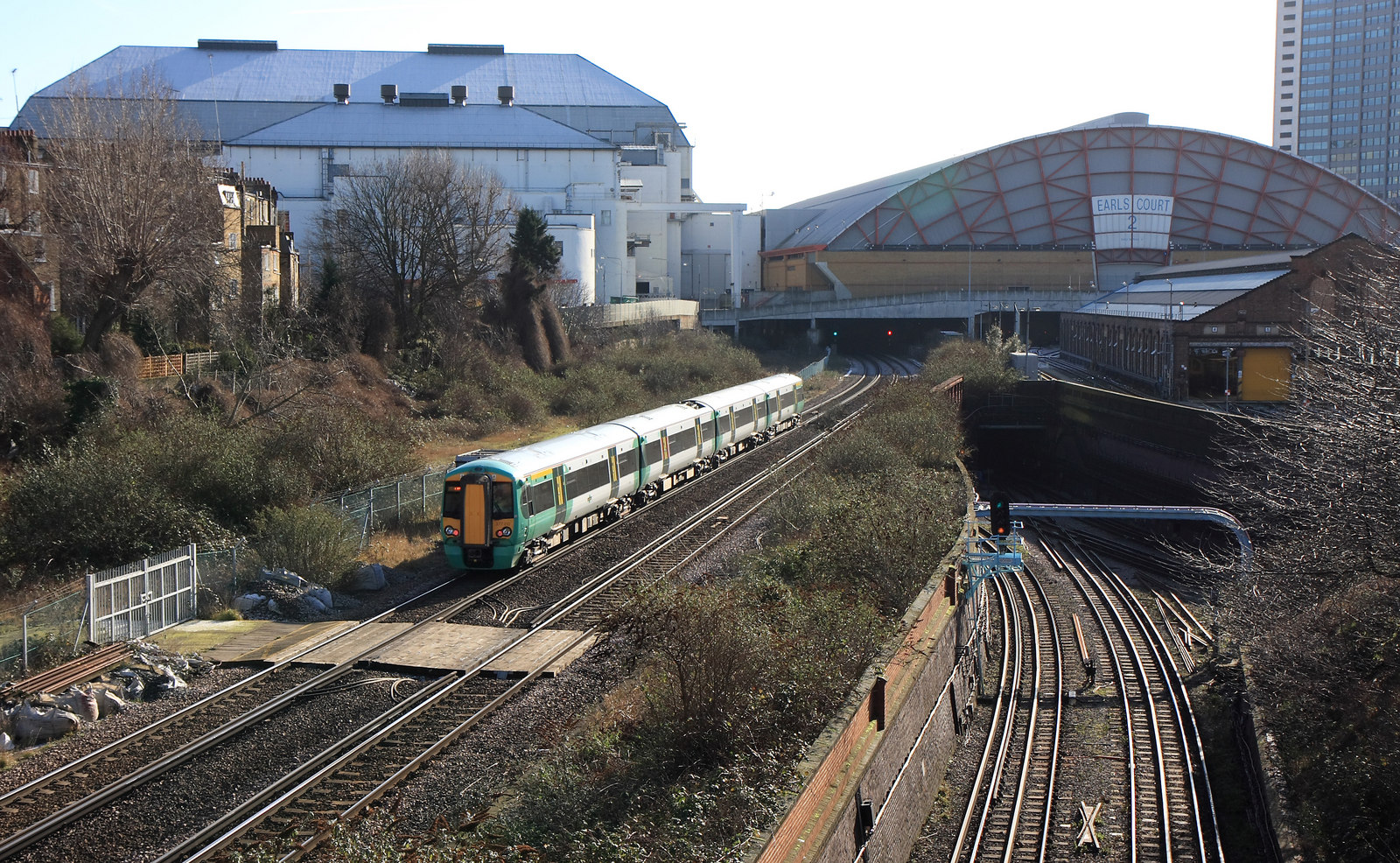
Lillie Bridge Depot shed to the right against Earls Court Exhibition Centre

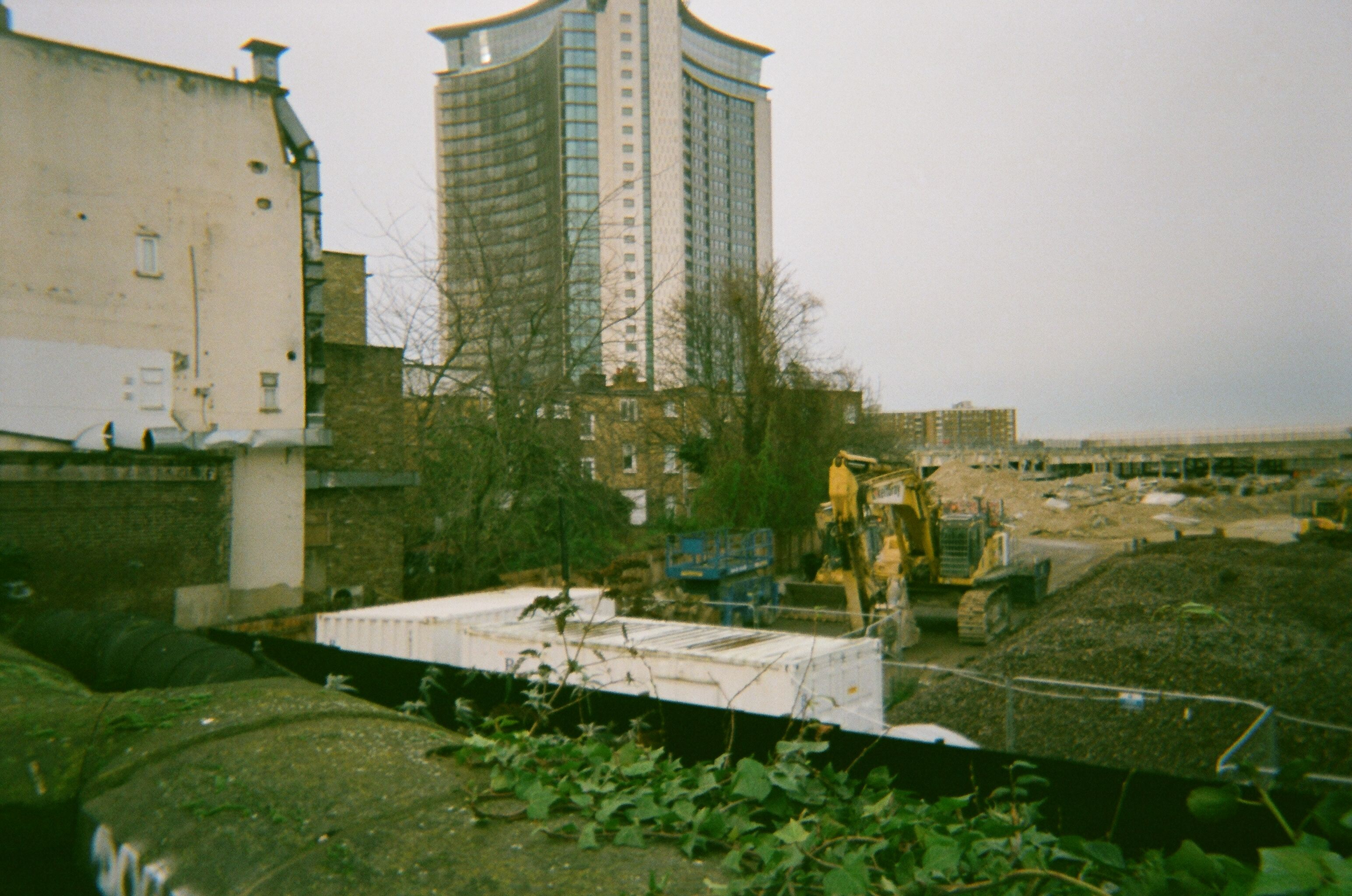
View from Lillie Bridge onto Earls Court II demolition site, 2015

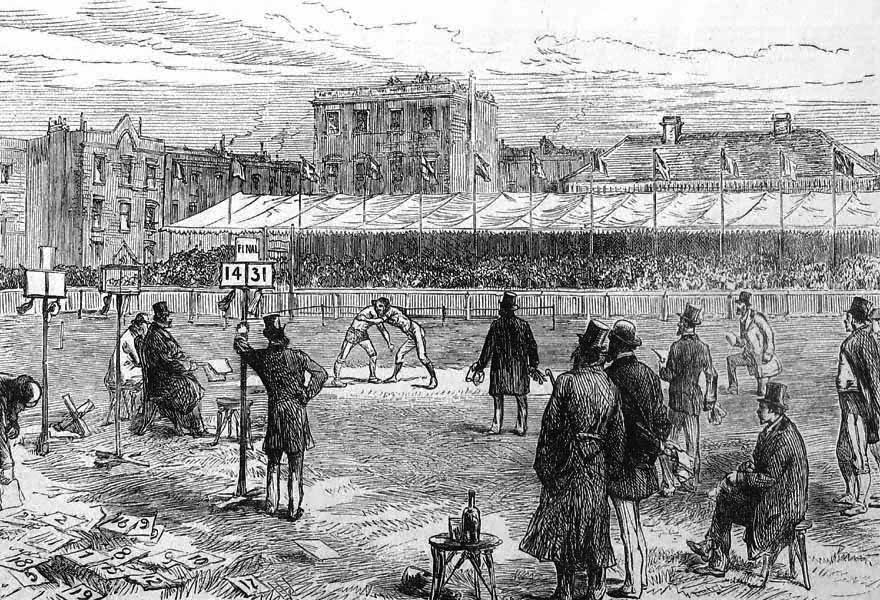
Wrestling at Lillie Bridge Grounds in 1879

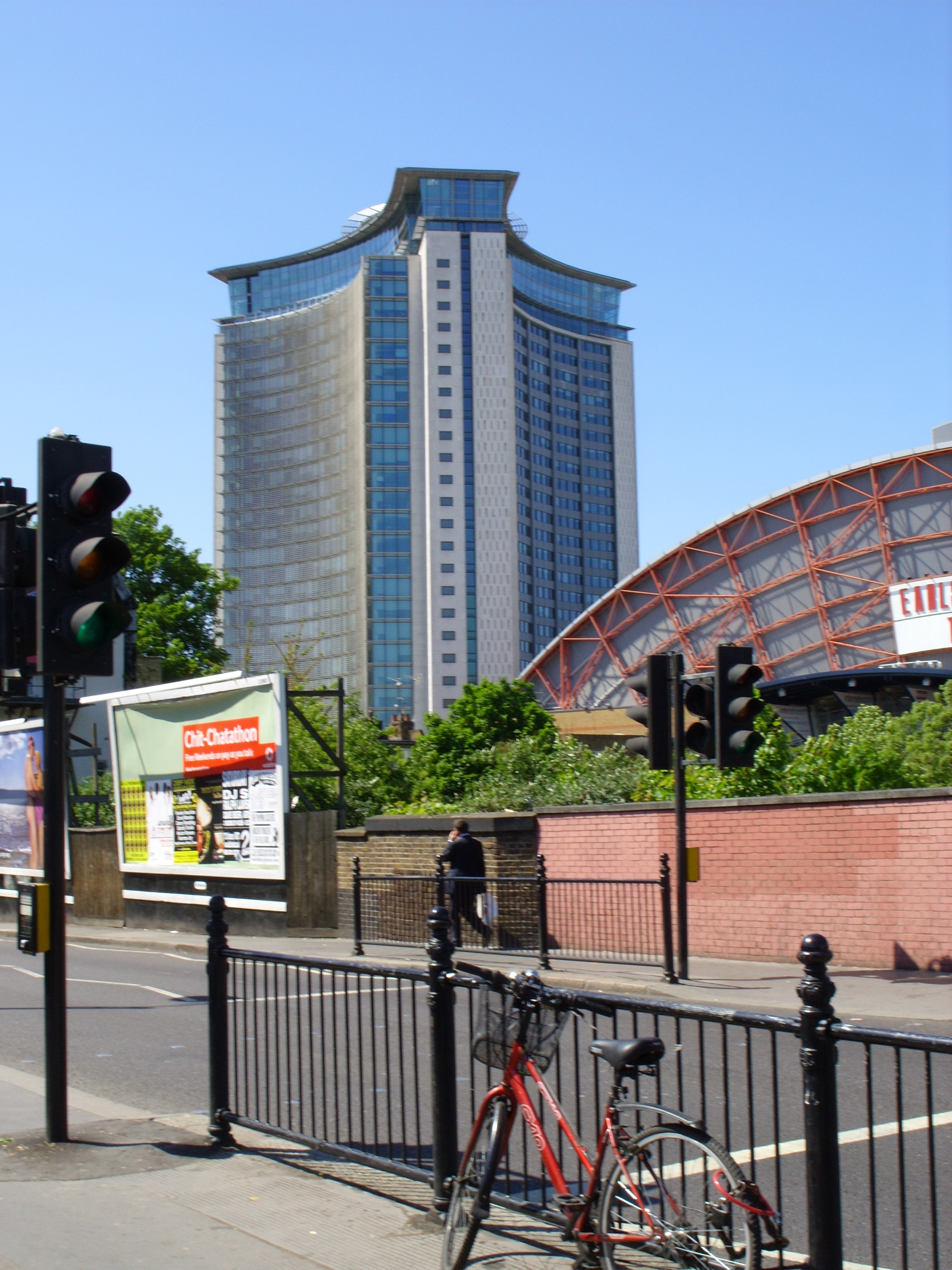
Tree Canopy behind Empress Place viewed from Lillie Bridge

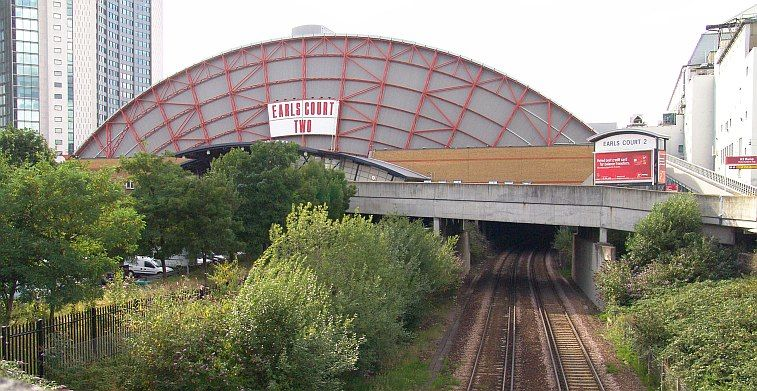
Green corridor along West London Line from Lillie Bridge

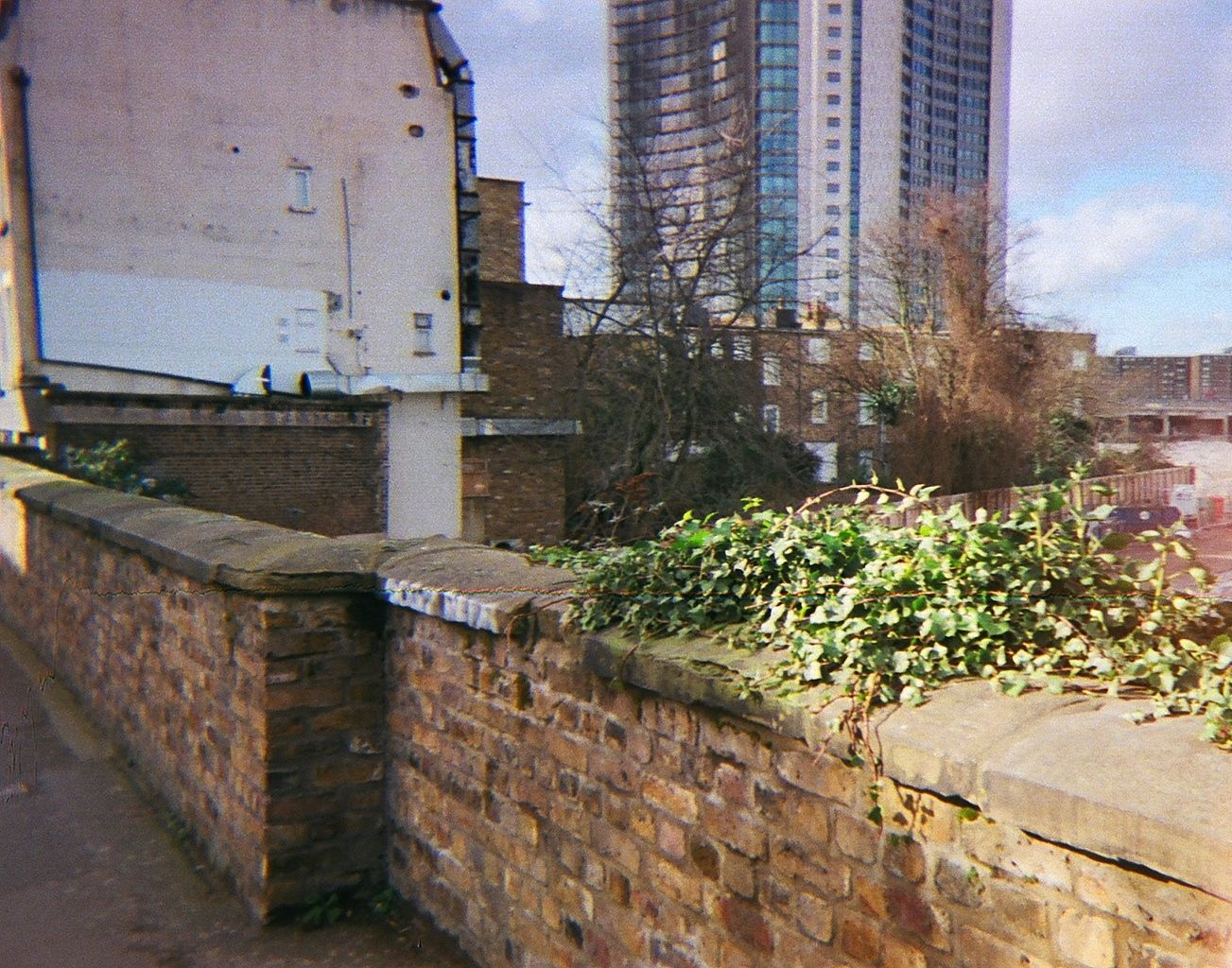
North parapet brickwork on Lillie Bridge 2016

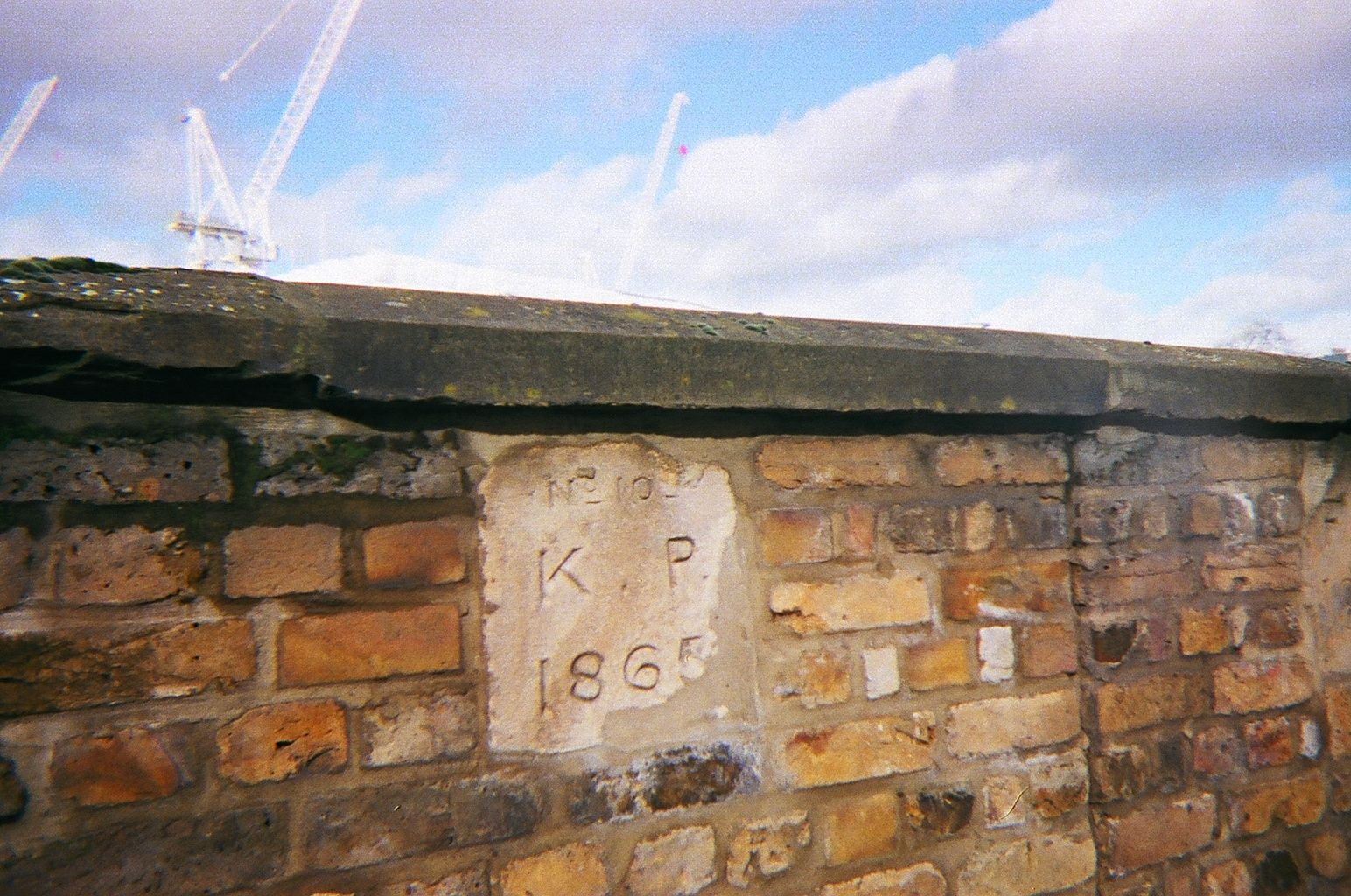
1865 plaque on north parapet of Lillie Bridge

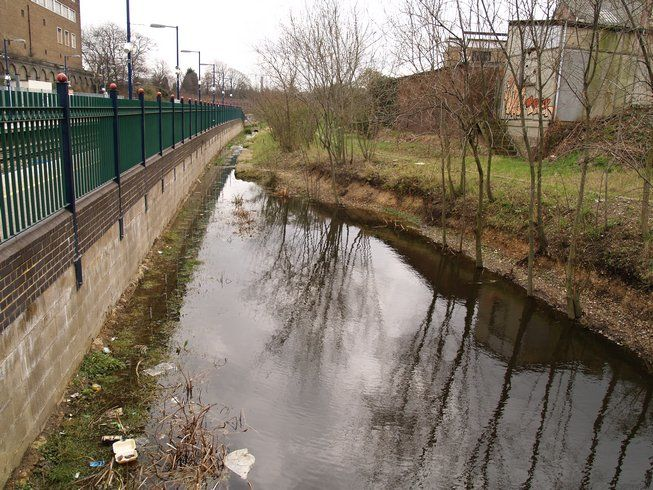
remnant of Counter's Creek at West Brompton station, Fulham
