= North End Road, Fulham =

Road in Fulham, London

Coordinates: 51.487822°N 0.203725°W

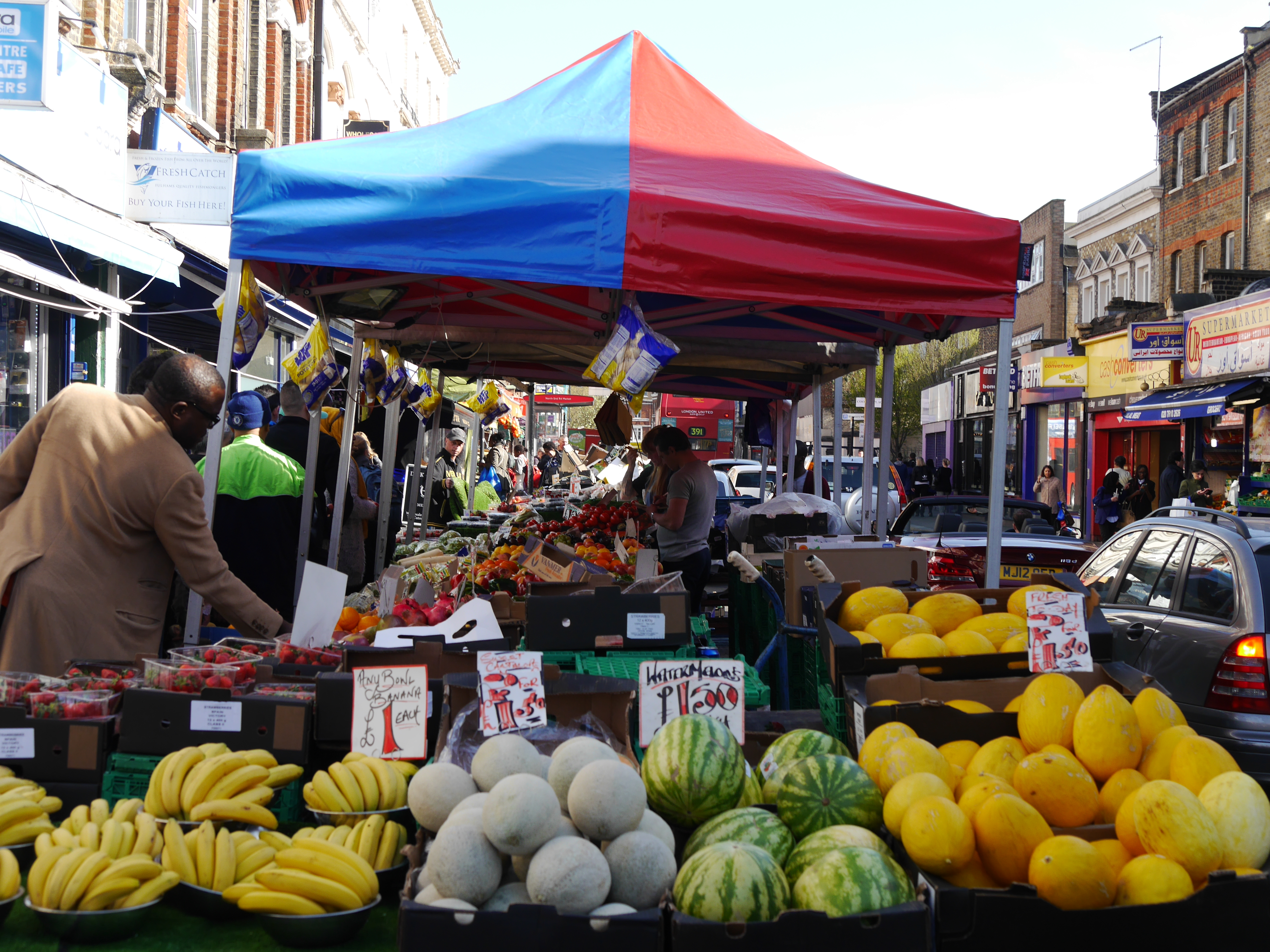
North End Road Market

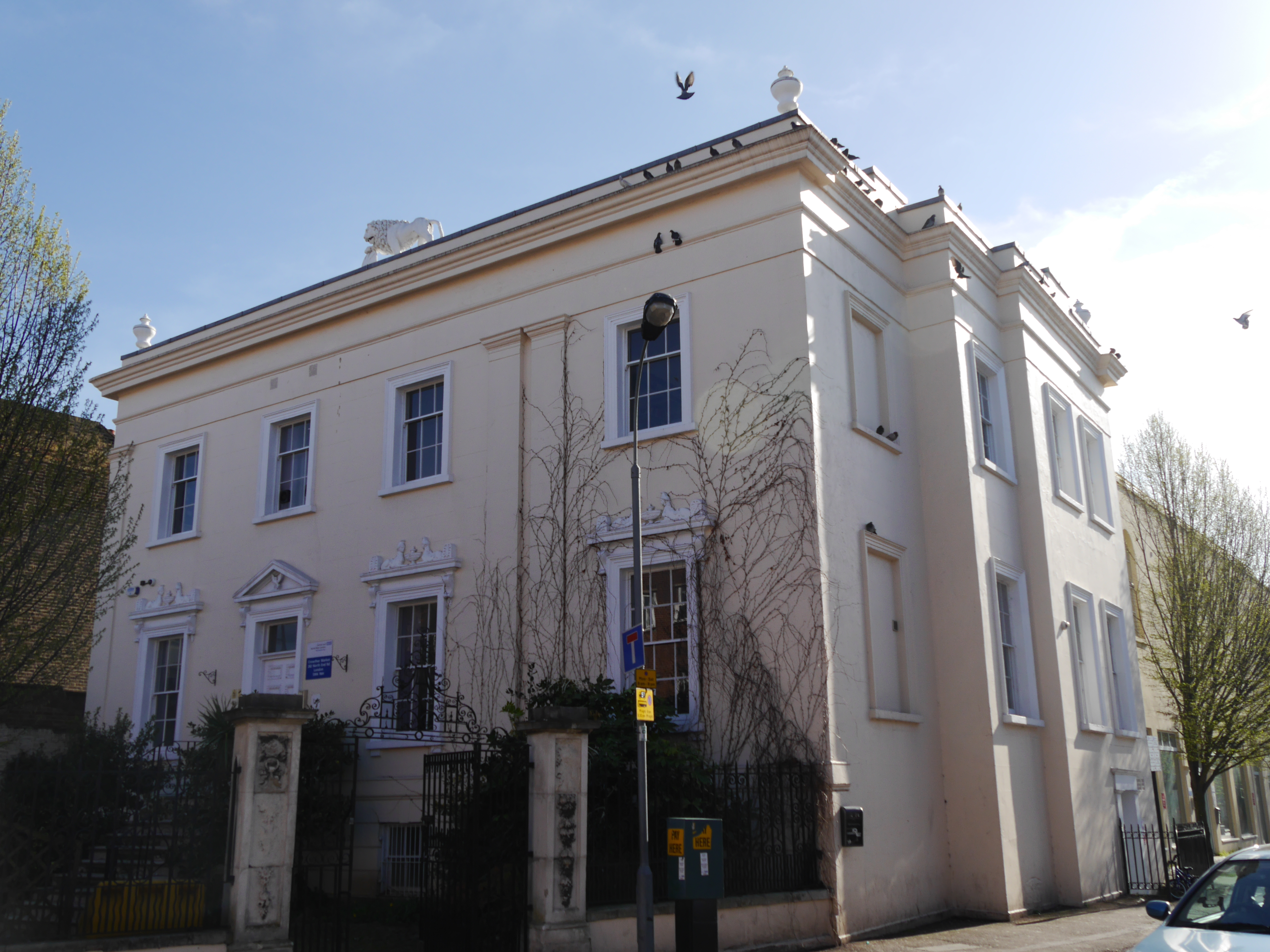
282 North End Road

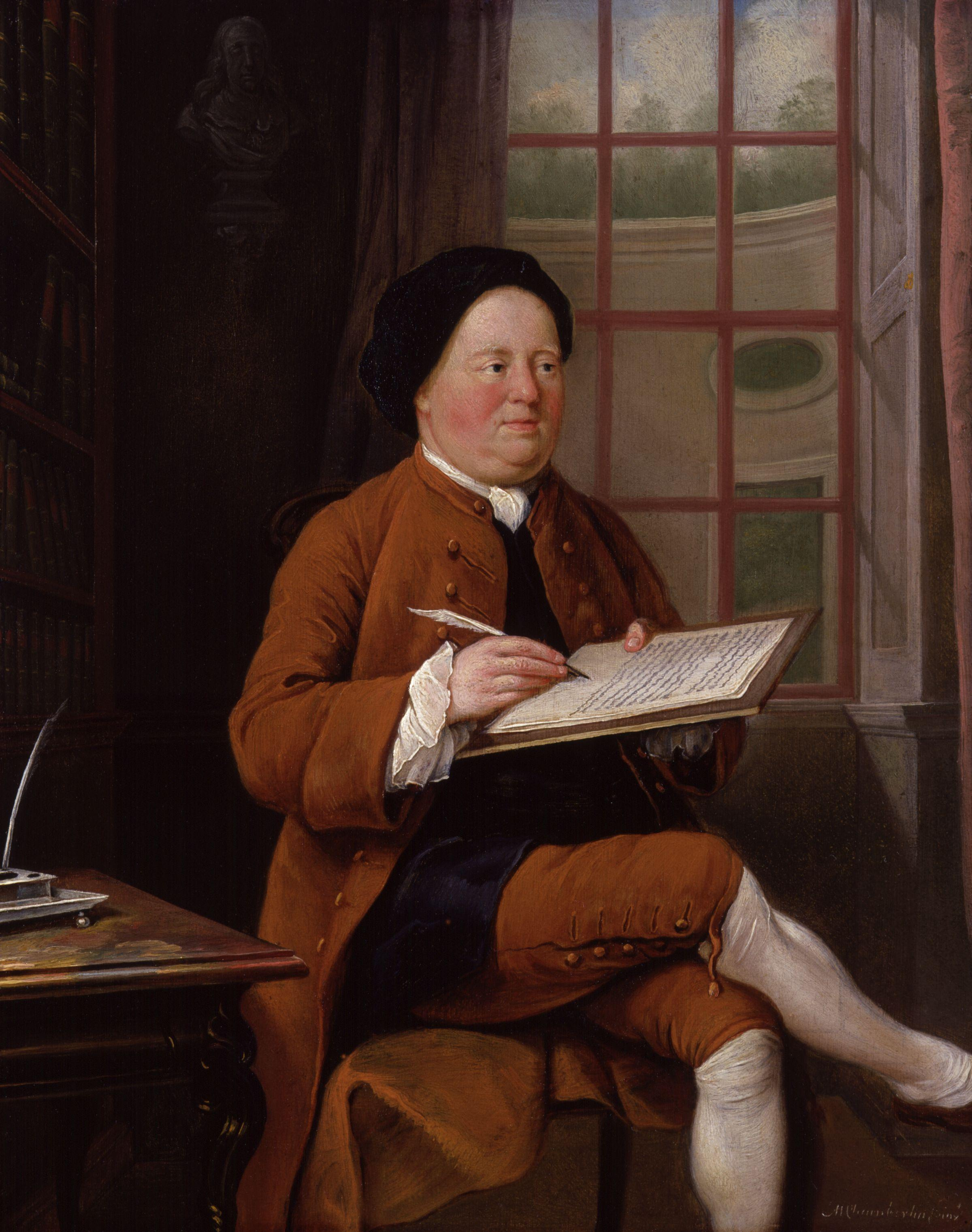
Samuel Richardson by Mason Chamberlin

North End Road is an ancient thoroughfare linking the former hamlet of North End, renamed "West Kensington", with the former village of Walham Green, renamed "Fulham Broadway" in Fulham in London.

It starts at Hammersmith Road (the A315), close to the Olympia exhibition centre, and runs south to Fulham Road (the A304), near Fulham Broadway. Its main junctions are with the A4 at West Kensington tube station, and with Lillie Road near the Clem Attlee Estate.

The street is signed as the B317 for its entire length except for the short final section between Dawes Road and Fulham Road, which is part of the A3219.

From its Northern end, when it was still part of the County of Middlesex, it was the site of several notable 18th-century villas, long since demolished. Among residents were Samuel Richardson, and latterly Edward and Georgiana Burne-Jones at "the Grange", and further south Samuel Foote, then Sir John Scott Lillie at "The Hermitage", with neighbours, Francesco Bartolozzi and later Benjamin Rawlinson Faulkner.

South of the junction with Lillie Road, signed as the A3128, there is the last remaining (1840s) and now Grade II listed villa, once the property of the Crowther family at no. 282, facing the stalls of North End Road street market, which has been in operation since the late 19th century. Shortly before the COVID-19 pandemic, the local council designated the front-garden of the Crowther villa, as a public haven.
