= Kensington Canal =

Destroyed canal in London, England

Coordinates: 51.4772°N 0.1844°W

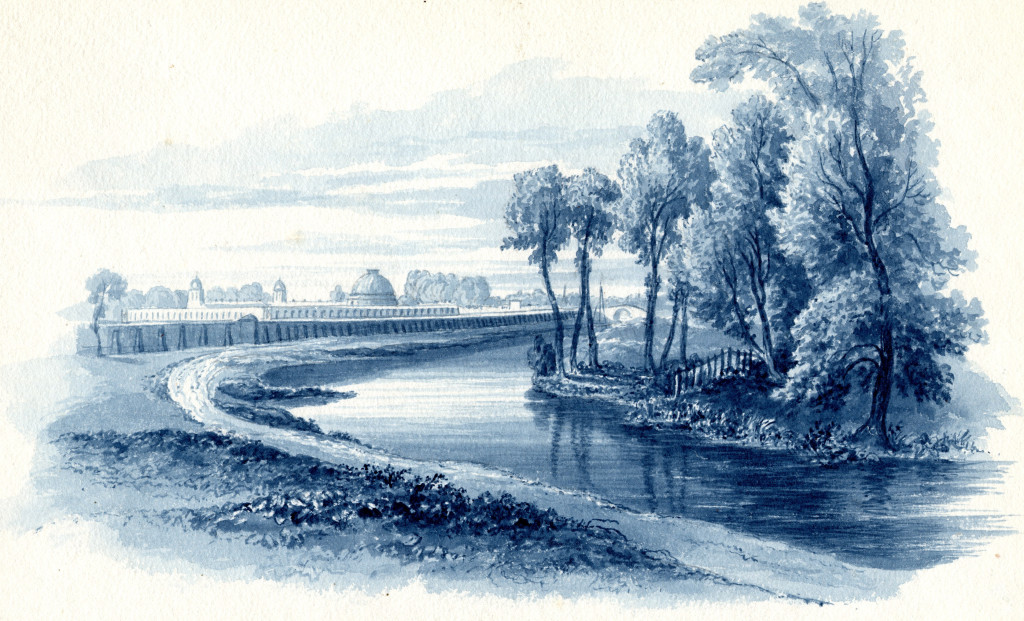
Brompton Cemetery and Kensington Canal by William Cowen

The Kensington Canal was a canal, about two miles long, opened in 1828 in London from the River Thames on the parish boundary between Chelsea and Fulham, along the line of Counter's Creek, to a basin near Warwick Road in Kensington. It had one lock near the Kensington Basin and wharves on the Fulham side, south of Lillie bridge. It was not commercially successful, and was purchased by a railway company, which laid a line along the route of the canal on the Fulham side. A second railway line followed in the filled-in littoral of the canal; thus one became London Underground's Wimbledon branch and the other, the West London Line.

== Origins ==
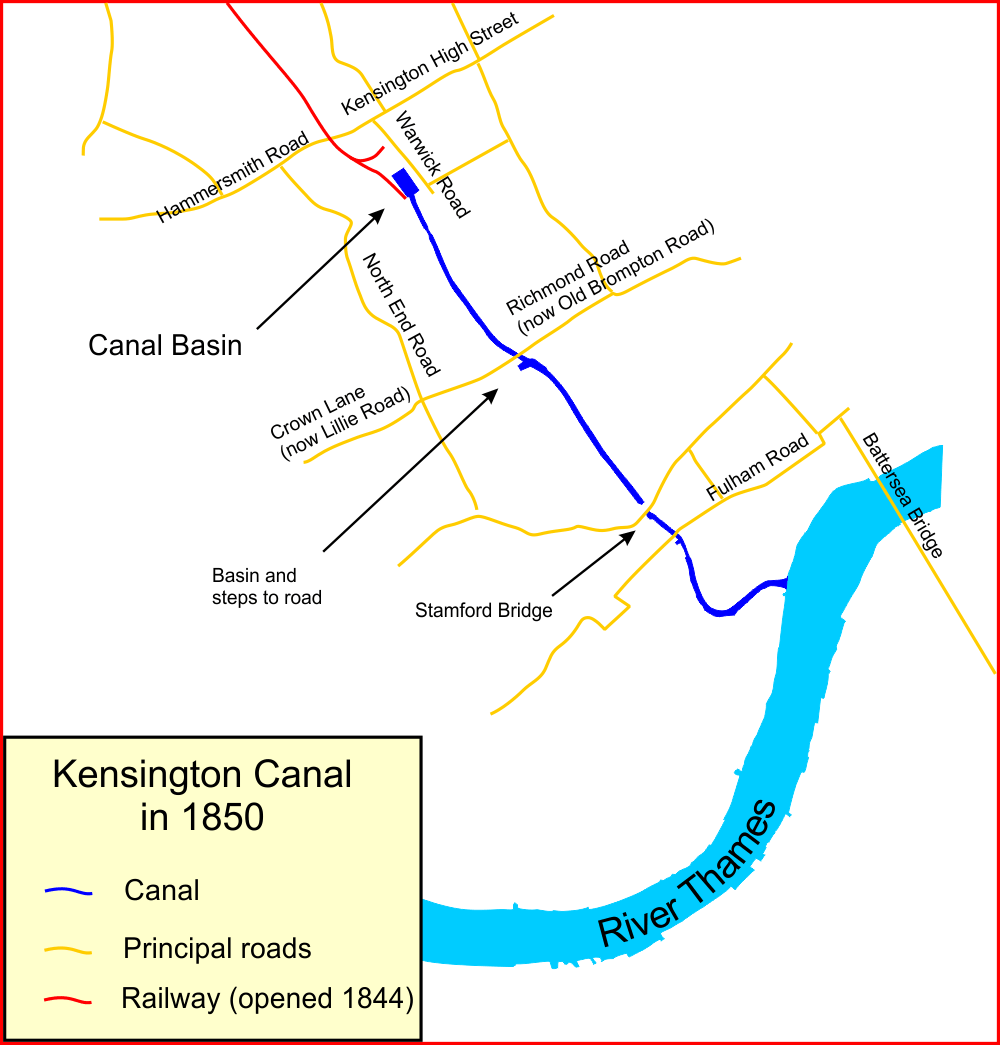
The Kensington Canal 1850

Counter's Creek was a minor tributary of the Thames running south from Kensal Green to join the main river west of Battersea Bridge. Lord Kensington, William Edwardes, seeing the success of the Regent's Canal, asked his surveyor William Cutbush in 1822 to draw up plans to convert the creek into a canal, with the object of bringing goods and minerals from the London docks to the Kensington area, then a rural district isolated from London.

Kensington Canal Act 1824
- Act of Parliament
- Parliament of the United Kingdom
- Long title: An Act for widening, deepening, enlarging and making navigable a certain Creek called Counter's Creek, from or from near Counter's Bridge, on the Road from London to Hammersmith, to the River Thames in the County of Middlesex, and for maintaining the same.
- Citation: 5 Geo. 4. c. lxv

Dates
- Royal assent: 28 May 1824

Text of statute as originally enacted

After some modifications, Cutbush's plan obtained sanction in the Kensington Canal Act 1824 (5 Geo. 4. c. lxv), and the Kensington Canal Company was incorporated in that year. William Edwardes and a group of his friends, including Sir John Scott Lillie, the second largest shareholder after Edwardes, were the proprietors; the cost of construction had been estimated as £7,969. The share capital of the company was £10,000 in one hundred shares of £100 each, (Note: The excess of capital over the construction cost was presumably for any necessary land acquisition and for "working capital", the purchase of ancillary equipment, etc) and they had powers to raise an additional £5,000 if necessary.

However this was a gross under-estimate, and John Rennie estimated that more than £34,000 would be needed to complete the work properly, including the rebuilding of Stamford Bridge. Rennie's nominee, Thomas Hollinsworth, was brought in as surveyor to the Canal Company.

Kensington Canal Act 1826
- Act of Parliament
- Parliament of the United Kingdom
- Long title: An Act to amend an Act for making a Canal from Counters Bridge, on the Road from London to Hammersmith, to the River Thames, in the County of Middlesex; and to enable the Kensington Canal Company to raise a further Sum of Money for the Completion of the said Canal.
- Citation: 7 Geo. 4. c. xcvi

Dates
- Royal assent: 26 May 1826

Text of statute as originally enacted

In May 1826 the company obtained powers by another act, the Kensington Canal Act 1826 (7 Geo. 4. c. xcvi) to raise a further £30,000. Notwithstanding this quadrupling of the anticipated cost of construction, the proprietors still entertained the notion of extending the canal northward to connect with the Grand Junction Canal at Paddington, involving eleven locks, was still under consideration.

The successful tenderer appears to have been Robert Tuck, probably in partnership with John Dowley. Work started in the same year, but was delayed by the bankruptcy of the contractor, Robert Tuck, and it was not opened until 12 August 1828.

== Opening ==
After considerable difficulty in the construction, the canal finally opened on 12 August 1828. The Times newspaper reported that "Witnessed by an immense number of persons the Right Hon. Lord Kensington and a number of friends to the undertaking, embarked in a stately barge at Battersea-bridge and proceeded up the canal ... The whole party entered the basin amidst the cheers of the multitudes assembled, the band on board playing 'God Save the King'. This was followed in the evening by a 'sumptuous dinner' with Lord Kensington in the chair and by his Lordship's command, and chiefly at his expense, a substantial dinner with a butt of porter was also given to about 200 of the workpeople."

The Annual Register described the canal as well as reporting the opening:

Opening of the Kensington Canal.—This ceremony, which had been reserved for the anniversary of his majesty's birth, was performed by Lord Kensington, and a number of friends to the undertaking, embarking in a barge at Battersea-bridge, and proceeding up the canal, accompanied by a number of craft loaded with timber, coals, sand &c., the first fruits of the speculation. The canal runs from the Thames, near Battersea-bridge, directly North two miles and a quarter, (Note: The direction of the canal was somewhat to the west of north, and its length must have been less than two miles) terminating close to the great Western road, half a mile distant from Kensington Palace: it is one hundred feet broad, and capable of affording passage for craft of one hundred tons burden; the basin is four hundred feet long by two hundred broad, and is situated in the most thriving and healthy part of the town. This canal, which is the only water conveyance to Kensington, has been completed at the expense of about [£40,000], and its income from wharfs, tonnage &c. is calculated at about [£2,500] per annum.

The Ordnance Survey plan made in 1850 confirms these features: there was a basin ("Kensington Canal Basin") near Kensington Road, and a lock immediately south of that location. The canal ran more or less straight in a south-south-easterly direction, turning east at the confluence to the River Thames at Chelsea Creek. There was a small basin and steps to street level immediately south of Richmond Road (now Lillie Road).

Traffic soon proved to be very limited, and in the mid-1830s Lord Holland described the canal as a total failure. Indeed, it was such a fiasco that it became a regular feature of derision in the Punch magazine.

The River Thames is tidal at the point where the canal joined it, so the canal was also tidal up to the lock near Kensington. The tidal flow brought silt into the canal and the feed from Counter's Creek was inadequate to clear it, so that problems were soon experienced with obstruction to the passage of vessels. More seriously, the times of day when vessels could navigate the canal were extremely short and constantly changing.

== Rescued by a railway ==
The proprietors of the canal had had ideas of extending it further north to join the Grand Junction Canal, (Note: Later to be a constituent of the Grand Union Canal) but the cost of building the original section hugely exceeded the anticipated cost, and extension was out of the question.

In the mid-1830s railways were being projected, in particular the London and Birmingham Railway and the Great Western Railway; both of these lines were to pass a little to the north of Kensington (at Willesden) and their London terminals were to be on the north-west fringe of London. Attention was given to gaining access for goods and minerals to and from the London docks, and proposals were developed for a railway branch to the canal; trans-shipping there to or from river lighters would give the desired connection.

A railway company was floated, called the Bristol, Birmingham and Thames Junction Railway, and when it was incorporated in 1836 it purchased the canal. The purchase price was £36,000, of which £10,000 was to be paid in cash and the remainder in shares in the new company.

The grandiose name of the railway was altered to the "West London Railway", and it built a short railway line from Willesden, joining with the main line railways there, to the canal basin. The railway line was leased to the London and Birmingham Railway in 1846, but it continued to own the canal; the Kensington Canal Company was wound up in the same year.

The railway and canal combination was utterly unsuccessful, and the hoped-for traffic, involving trans-shipment at Kensington, never appeared. The main line railways – the Great Western and the London and North Western Railway (as successor to the London and Birmingham Railway) – needed a rail connection to lines south of the Thames, and in 1859 an authorising act of Parliament gave authority to a joint venture of several railway companies to extend the railway south from Kensington, converting the canal to a railway. At the southern end the railway diverged a little to the west of the canal, and crossed the Thames on a large bridge. This left a short stub of the original waterway in existence, from the Thames almost to Stamford Bridge: it served flour mills and the Imperial Gas Works, until traffic ceased in 1967.

Construction of the railway built over the remainder of the canal, and the later railway developments in Earl's Court obliterated the canal. Its original course can best be understood by considering the route of the present-day West London Line from the Thames to Kensington (Olympia) station.

== See also ==
- Canals of Great Britain
- History of the British canal system
