= Counter's Creek =

Culverted stream in west London

Coordinates: 51°28′29″N 0°10′49″W

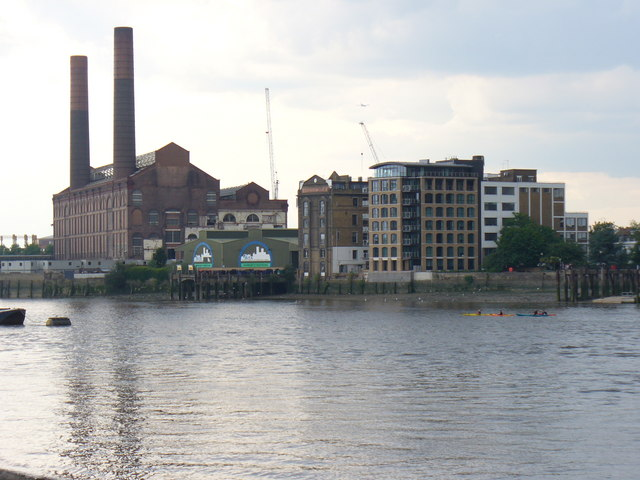
Lots Road Power Station where Counter's Creek joins the Thames as Chelsea Creek

Counter's Creek, ending in Chelsea Creek, the lowest part of which still exists, was a stream that flowed from Kensal Green, by North Kensington and flowed south into the River Thames on the Tideway at Sands End, Fulham. Its remaining open watercourse is the quay of Chelsea Creek.

== Course ==
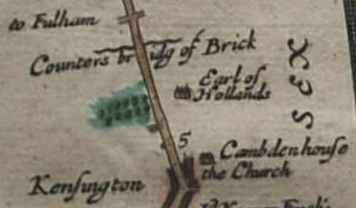
A brick bridge over Counter's Creek shown in a 1675 map by John Ogilby.

Counter's Creek flowed from Kensal Green, by North Kensington at the confluence of two small headwaters that rose just west of Ladbroke Grove and entered the stream close to Latimer Road just south of St Quintin Avenue. The stream flowed south through Kensal Green Cemetery, Little Wormwood Scrubs, North Kensington, past Shepherd's Bush to one side and the Olympia part of Kensington on the other and then past Earl's Court and Old or West Brompton on the other. As a vestige, an overflow verdant ditch exists beside Platform 4 (trains to Olympia) of West Brompton Underground Station. It passes Brompton Cemetery and Chelsea F.C. ground at Stamford Bridge. On the left bank where the creek meets the Thames is the former Lots Road Power Station. The tidal mouth is a watercourse, connecting to the Thames with boat moorings and is shown on modern maps as Chelsea Creek; this part of Fulham is sometimes known by the toponym "Sands End".

== History ==
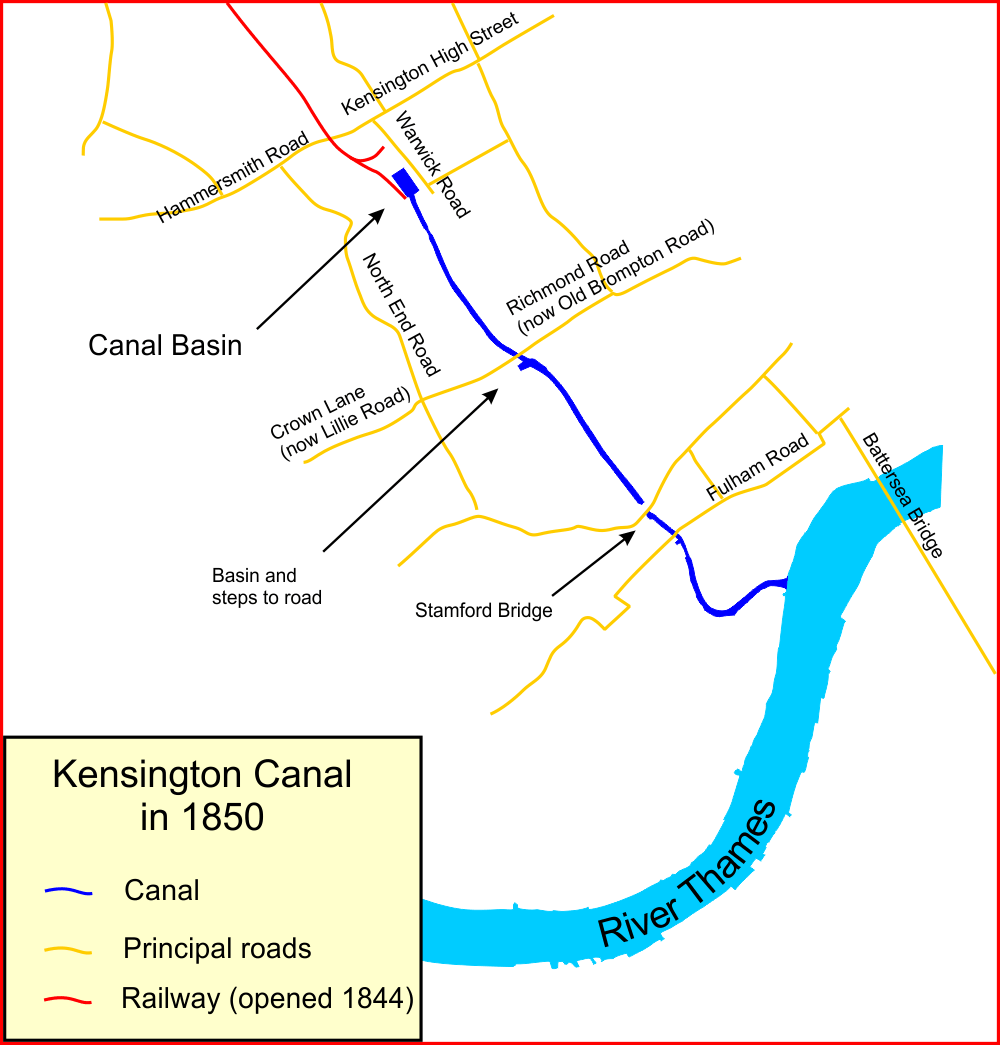
The Kensington Canal 1850 aka Counter's Creek

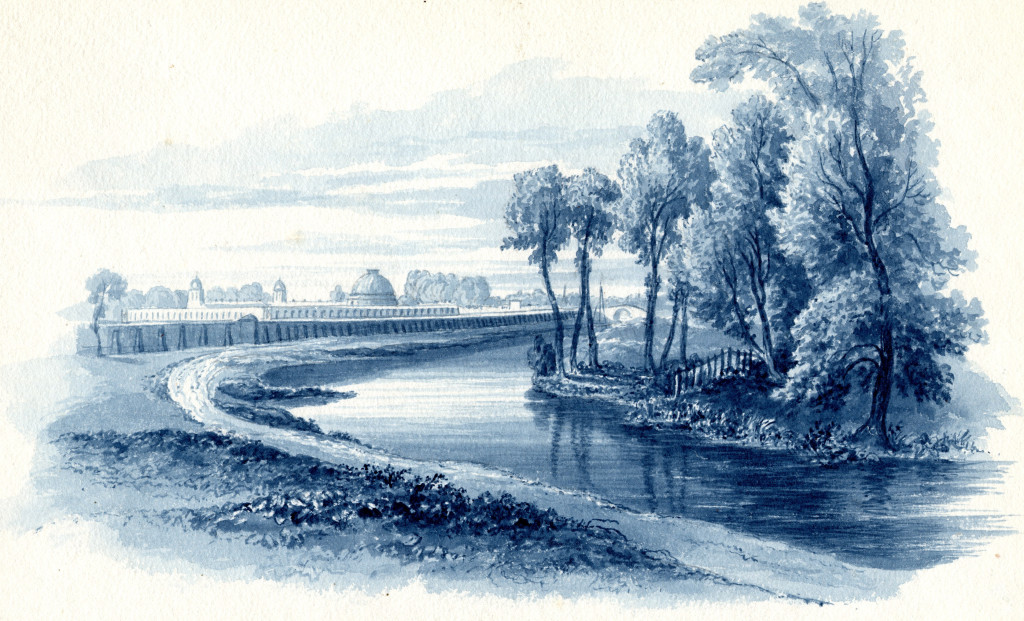
Kensington Canal by William Cowen

The upper reaches have been variously known as Billingswell Ditch, Pools Creek and Counters Creek. In the Middle Ages, the creek was known as Billingwell Dyche, derived from 'Billing's spring or stream'. It formed the boundary between the parishes of Kensington and Fulham. By the eighteenth century, the creek had become known as Counter's Creek, which is believed to derive from 'Counter's Bridge' which crossed the creek at the west end of Kensington High Street. This was first recorded in the fourteenth century as 'Countessesbrugge', and may be called after Matilda/Maud, Countess of Oxford, who in early centuries after the Conquest held the manor of Kensington. Stamford Bridge is considered to be a corruption of 'Samfordesbrigge' meaning 'the bridge at the sandy ford' where the Fulham Road crosses the brook. The existing Stamford Bridge was built of brick in 1860–2 and has been partly reconstructed since then. The name is more generally used to refer to the nearby Stamford Bridge Stadium, which is the home of Chelsea Football Club. In 1824–8 the lowest part of the creek was developed into the Kensington Canal. This was taken over by the Bristol Birmingham & Thames Junction Railway in the 1830s and subsequently much was culverted to take the West London Line along its course in 1859–63. This railway route links Clapham Junction to Willesden Junction via Kensington Olympia. Only the lower reach remained in use, supplying coal to Sands End gas works and later to Lots Road Power Station. The stream was visible as a surface river on the west side of Little Wormwood Scrubs on Ordnance Survey maps pre-1930 by which time surface water drains had been introduced, some of which fed the sewer, others which conveyed surface water separately.

Its depression has been conveniently used since the 19th century and rise of the water closet for the sanitation of the area by building a combined sewer underneath it and to prevent flooding, to construct where the Metropolitan Board of Works and London boroughs have found affordable, separate surface water drains leading to the Thames.

...necessity arose for making a sewer to intercept the sewage of the district west of Cremorne [Chelsea], and to help it on its way to Barking. But there was no good thoroughfare from Cremorne eastwards along which to construct it; so it was proposed to form a route for the sewer, and at the same time to complete an unfinished work by continuing the embankment and road on to Battersea. Application was made to Government for the return of £38,150, a sum which remained unexpended from the amount originally raised for the bridge and embankment, and which would have assisted in the prosecution of the new work. The application, however, was unsuccessful, and Sir William Tite, who from the first took a very active interest in the matter, appealed to the Metropolitan Board of Works to undertake the work independently of Government assistance. The Board, therefore, made several applications to Parliament for an Act, (Note: Thames Embankment (Chelsea) Act 1868 (31 & 32 Vict. c. cxxxv)) which they succeeded in obtaining in 1868. The designs for the embankment, roadway, and sewer were at once prepared by [Sir Joseph] Bazalgette, the engineer to the Board, and the whole work was completed and opened to the public in 1874.

== See also ==
- Tributaries of the River Thames
- List of rivers in England

== Notes ==
Next confluence upstream	River Thames	Next confluence downstream
Falconbrook (south)	Counter's Creek	River Westbourne (north)
