= West Brompton station =

London Underground, London Overground and National Rail station

West Brompton
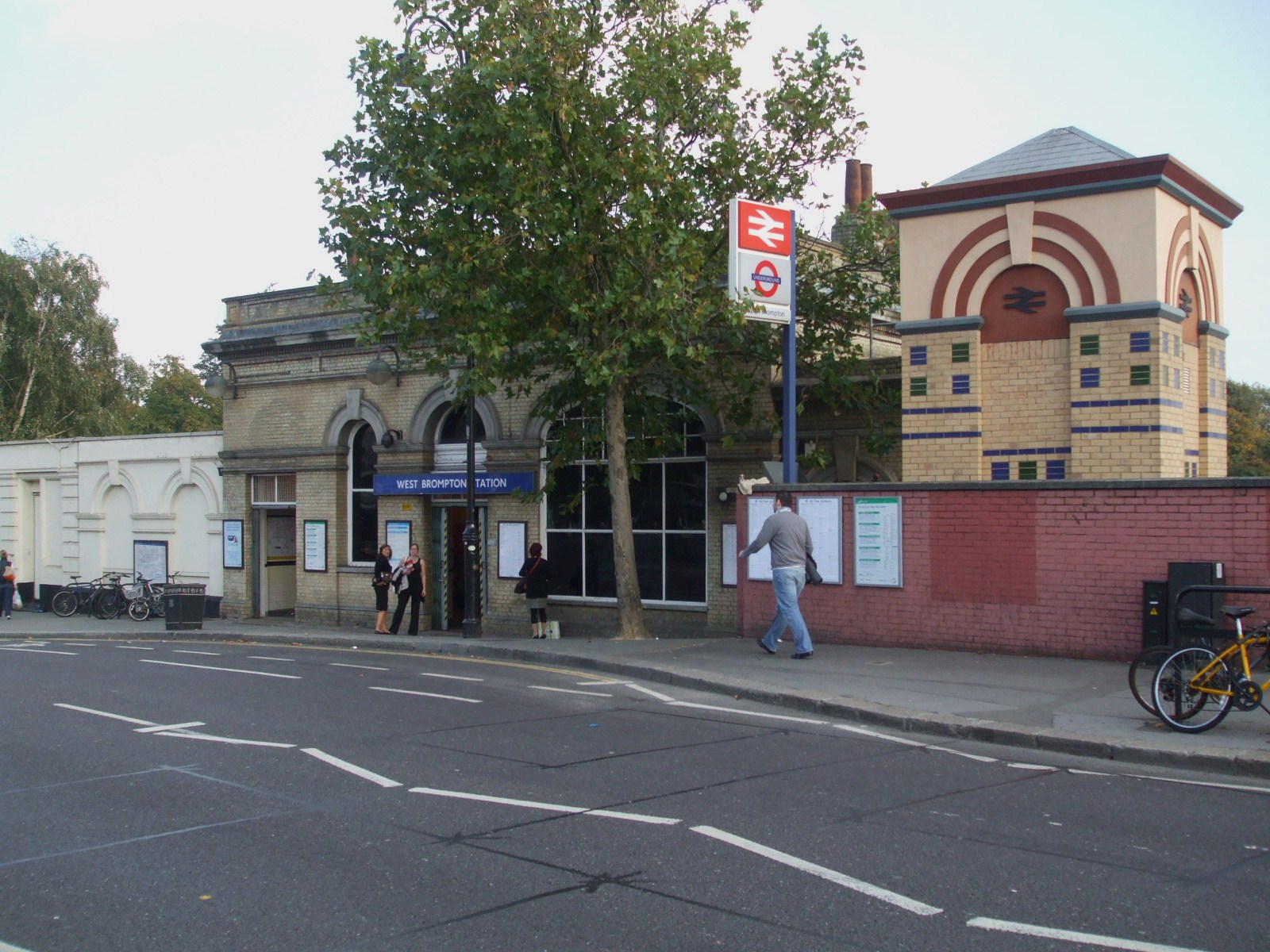
- Station entrance
- Interactive map of West Brompton

General information
- Location: West Brompton
- Local authority: Royal Borough of Kensington and Chelsea
- Managed by: London Underground; London Overground (western platforms only)
- Station code: WBP
- DfT category: E
- Number of platforms: 4
- Accessible: Yes (except District line westbound platform)
- Fare zone: 2

London Underground annual entry and exit
- 2021: ▲2.73 million
- 2022: ▲4.42 million
- 2023: ▲5.18 million
- 2024: ▼4.86 million
- 2025: ▲5.26 million

National Rail annual entry and exit
- 2020–21: ▼1.411 million
- 2021–22: ▲3.027 million
- 2022–23: ▲3.511 million
- 2023–24: ▲4.252 million
- 2024–25: ▲4.515 million

Key dates
- 1 September 1866: Opened (WLEJR)
- 12 April 1869: Started (Terminus) (DR)
- 1 March 1880: Started (Through Service) (DR)
- 21 October 1940: Ended (WLL)
- 1 June 1999: Restarted (WLL)

Other information
- External links: TfL station info page; Departures; Facilities
- Coordinates: 51.4866°N 0.1957°W

West Brompton is a Grade II-listed interchange station located on Old Brompton Road (A3218) in West Brompton, West London. The station is served by the District line of the London Underground; the Mildmay line of the London Overground; and National Rail services operated by Southern along the West London line.

The station is situated immediately south of the demolished Earls Court Exhibition Centre and west of Brompton Cemetery in the Royal Borough of Kensington and Chelsea. The station's location on the West London line forms a borough boundary and its tracks are shared between Kensington & Chelsea and the London Borough of Hammersmith and Fulham.

== History ==
The West London Extension Joint Railway (WLEJR) was opened in the early 1860s. It joined the southern end of the West London Joint Railway at Kensington (Olympia) station with Clapham Junction station and ran through West Brompton although a station was not opened until 1866. The original station was designed by the chief engineer of the Metropolitan and District Railway, Sir John Fowler and thus has local railway associations that go back to 1838. The current Lillie (road) bridge dates from 1860 and is the work of Fowler. The soon to disappear Lillie Bridge Railway and Engineering Depot, opened in 1872, is close by. Other historic associations are with the Lillie Bridge Grounds, a noted 19th c. athletics, cricket, ballooning and cycling venue adjacent to the West of the station and Brompton Cemetery adjacent to the East. From 1887, the station gave access to John Robinson Whitley's Earl's Court exhibition grounds and from 1937 to 2014 it was the alternative access to Earls Court Exhibition Centre, now demolished.

On 12 April 1869, the District Railway (DR, now the District line) opened its own station adjacent to the WLEJR station as the terminus and only station on its extension from Gloucester Road station (Earl's Court station did not open until 1871). The original plan was to connect the DR to the WLEJR but this did not take place.

On 1 March 1880, the DR opened an extension south from West Brompton to Putney Bridge. In 1906 a heat wave affected the railway such that one of the Underground's electric rails was warped at the station; trains coasted over the affected track until it was repaired.

In 1940, during World War II, several WLL stations sustained bomb damage. Passenger services on the WLL between Willesden Junction and Clapham Junction were withdrawn on 21 October 1940. The Underground station remained in use and the WLL continued in use for freight traffic. The WLL station buildings and platforms were subsequently demolished.

Full passenger services resumed on the WLL in 1994, but it was not until 1 June 1999 that new Network Rail platforms were opened at West Brompton by the then Minister of Transport, Glenda Jackson. There is a commemorative plaque to this effect on the Western lift tower. The station design was by Robinson Kenning and Gallagher of Croydon. The lift tower design is an echo of the decorative brickwork by the 19th c. City of London architect and surveyor, John Young designer of the nearby Empress Place and Lillie Road terrace in Fulham. The works were funded by the Royal Borough of Kensington and Chelsea and the London Borough of Hammersmith and Fulham on whose border the station lies.

The Mildmay line platforms do not have a separate entrance and access is from the Underground station. The District line serves platforms 1 and 2 and the Mildmay line serves platforms 3 and 4. There is a fence between platforms 2 and 3, but they are on the same level and it is possible to pass directly between them.

There are lifts to both Overground platforms for wheelchair access, and this means there is also step-free access to the eastbound District line platform, but not the westbound one. The station is in a cutting that is covered at one end.

To the west side of the station,there is a railway nature site,an area filled with greenery and a pond bordering platform 4 and the luxury flats west of the station.This is where the kensington canal used to run through.

== Services ==
=== National Rail ===
National Rail services at West Brompton are operated by Southern using Class 377 EMUs. The typical off-peak service in trains per hour is:

- 1 tph to Watford Junction
- 1 tph to East Croydon

Additional services call at the station during the peak hours.

=== London Overground ===
West Brompton is located on the Mildmay line of the London Overground, with services operated by Class 378 EMUs. The following off-peak service pattern is provided, in trains per hour:

- 4 tph to Clapham Junction
- 4 tph to Stratford via Willesden Junction

During the late evenings, Mildmay line services run between Clapham Junction and Willesden Junction only.

=== London Underground ===
The typical off-peak London Underground service on the District line in trains per hour is:

- 6 tph to Tower Hill of which 3 continue to Barking
- 6 tph to Edgware Road
- 12 tph to Wimbledon

Additional services, including trains to and from Dagenham East and Upminster call at the station during the peak hours.

Preceding station	National Rail	Following station
Kensington (Olympia)	Southern West London Line	Imperial Wharf
Preceding station	London Overground	Following station
Kensington (Olympia) towards Stratford	Mildmay line West London line	Imperial Wharf towards Clapham Junction
Preceding station	London Underground	Following station
Fulham Broadway towards Wimbledon	District line	Earl's Court towards Edgware Road or Upminster
Disused railways
Chelsea & Fulham	West London Railway	Kensington (Olympia)

== Bibliography ==
- Hobhouse, Hermione, ed. (1986). "The Kensington Canal, railways and related developments". Survey of London: Volume 42, Kensington Square To Earl's Court. London. pp. 322–338 – via British History Online (transcription).
