= Watney =

Watney is a popular surname, and there are many notable people that goes by the name. They include, but not limited to:

- Ada Annie Watney (1868–1938), Ladies' Automobile Club founder
- Claude Watney (1866–1919), British brewery director and motor dealer
- Constance Watney (1878–1947), British missionary nurse
- Heidi Watney (born 1981), American sportscaster
- Herbert Watney (1843–1932), English physician, landowner and philanthropist
- James Watney (1800–1884), English brewer and landowner
- James Watney Jr (1832–1886), English brewer and politician
- Katherine Watney (1870–1958, British missionary nurse
- John Watney (1834–1923), English antiquarin, of the Watney brewing family
- Nick Watney (born 1981), American golfer
- Simon Watney, British writer, art historian and activist

== Fictional characters ==
- Mark Watney, the protagonist of the novel The Martian by Andy Weir and its film adaptation.

== See also ==
- Watney family
- Watney Combe & Reid
