= High Elms Manor =

Garston Manor
- Location within Hertfordshire

General information
- Type: Country House
- Architectural style: Georgian
- Location: Garston, Hertfordshire, England
- Coordinates: 51.701961°N 0.393687°W

Website
- http://www.highelmsmanor.com

High Elms Manor is a grade II listed Georgian country house located near Garston in Hertfordshire, England. It was built around 1812, and was originally known as "High Elms", but from the 1890s to 2010 it was called Garston Manor.

In the post-World War II years the house was a rehabilitation centre, but it later fell derelict. In the 1990s an American named Sheila O'Neill bought and restored it and it was used by her as a Montessori School until her death, and then subsequently by her daughters, who have now put it on the market.

== Augustus and Mary Ann Cavendish Bradshaw ==
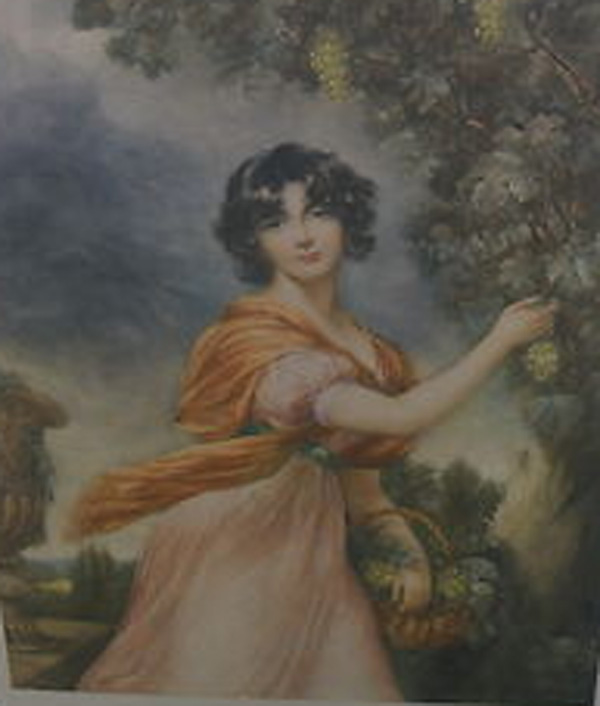
Mary Ann Cavendish Bradshaw also known as the Countess of Westmeath. Portrait painted by Sir Thomas Lawrence in 1806.

Augustus Cavendish Bradshaw was the originator of High Elms. He appears to have purchased the estate in the early 1800s and either built High Elms or made very substantial alterations to a small existing building. He and his wife Mary Ann were a very notable couple at this time.

Augustus was born in 1768. His father was Sir Henry Cavendish of Doveridge Hall in Derbyshire and his mother was Sarah Bradshaw, who later became Baroness Waterpark. He was educated at Cambridge University.

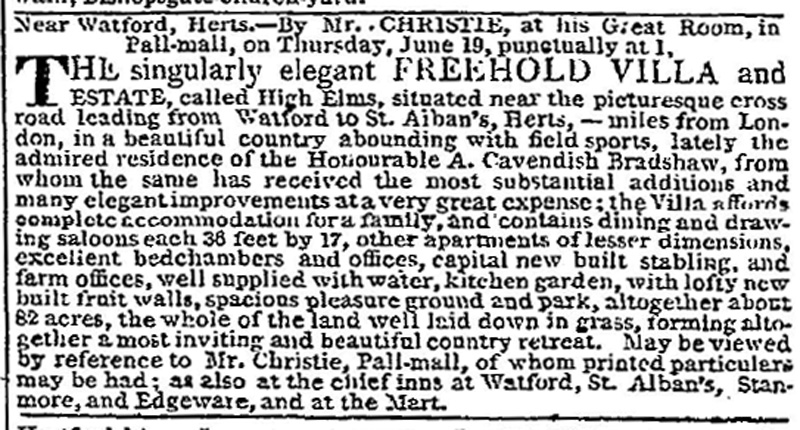
Advertisement for the sale of High Elms by Augustus Cavendish Bradshaw in 1817.

In 1796, Augustus married Mary Ann (sometimes written Marianne) Jeffreys who was the daughter of James St John Jeffreys of Blarney Castle in Ireland. Mary Ann had previously been married to George Frederick Nugent, the Earl of Westmeath and she became the Countess of Westmeath. In 1796 in a sensational court case she divorced Nugent and soon after married Augustus.

Mary Ann had considerable literary talent and published two novels. The first, Maria Countess of D’Alva (1808), is set at the time of the Spanish Armada in the 16th century. The second, Ferdinand and Ordella: A Russian Story (1810), is set in the time of Peter the Great. Both novels were written during the period that the couple lived at High Elms. In 1806, Sir Thomas Lawrence painted the portraits of both Mary Ann and Augustus.

Augustus became a member of Parliament in 1805 and continued in this position until 1817. When he completed his parliamentary career he put High Elms on the market. The advertisement in The Times in 1817 read as follows and is shown on the right.

The singularly elegant freehold villa called High Elms situated near the picturesque cross road leading from Watford to St Albans, Hertfordshire is in a beautiful country abounding with field sports lately the admired residence of the Honourable A. Cavendish Bradshaw from whom the same has received the most substantial additions and many elegant improvements at a very great expense.

== Residents of High Elms between 1820 and 1890 ==
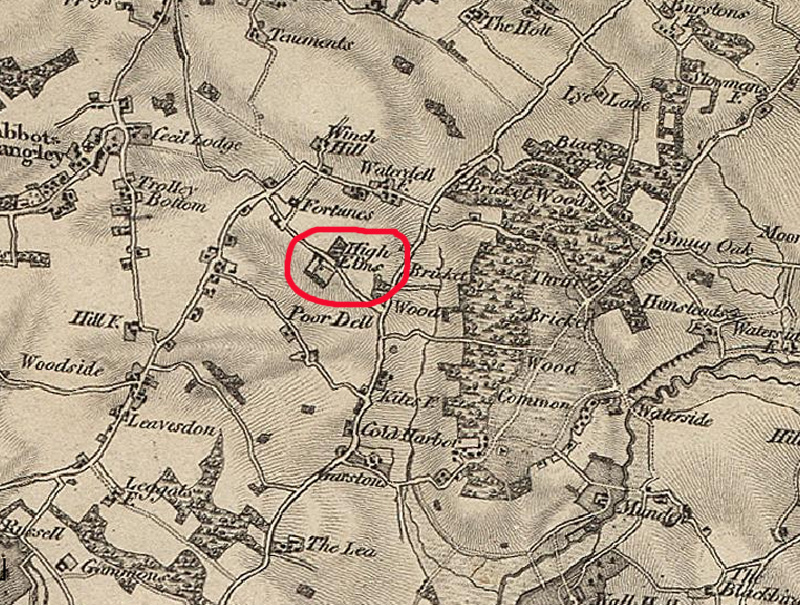
Map of Garston in 1856 showing the location of High Elms.

John Ryley bought High Elms soon after this and he and his wife Charlotte remained there until he died in 1845.

John Ryley was born in 1786. In 1806 he married Charlotte Catherine Coxe, who was the daughter of General Coxe of Cavendish Square. He worked for some years in the Bengal civil service and after that was a magistrate for Hertfordshire for thirty years.

After he purchased High Elms it appears that he acquired large parcels of the surrounding land so that the estate was increased from 82 acres in 1817 to 170 acres in 1847. He also bought Fortune Farm and Winch Farm which were adjoining properties. The advertisement which sold all of these estates after his death and gives further details was in The Times of 1847. A map which shows these properties is at the right.

The next owner of High Elms was Arthur Currie. The 1851 census shows that he and his wife Dora were living on the estate and states that Arthur was a magistrate and distiller. Arthur was born in 1804 at Bromley by Bow. He was first married to Charlotte Judith Smith who died in 1840. In 1845 he married Dorothea (Dora) Seymour who was the daughter of Admiral Sir Michael Seymour. The couple seem to have lived at High Elms for about ten years.

In 1863 Robert Pryor acquired High Elms after he retired from the Bar. He was born in 1812 in Hamstead. His father was Thomas Marlborough Pryor. He was educated at Cambridge and graduated in 1834 after which he was called to the Bar and for many years practiced as an Equity Barrister and conveyancer. In 1844 he married Elizabeth Caroline Birch the daughter of Wyrley Birch of Wretham Hall, Norfolk.

After Robert came to live at High Elms, he became Chairman of the Quarter Sessions at St Albans in 1867 and was made a deputy lieutenant of the County in 1874. For over 20 years he was Chairman of the Watford Board of Guardians and occupied many other public positions. He died at High Elms in 1889 at the age of 78. In 1890 the property was advertised for sale in The Times.

== Claude and Ada Annie Watney ==
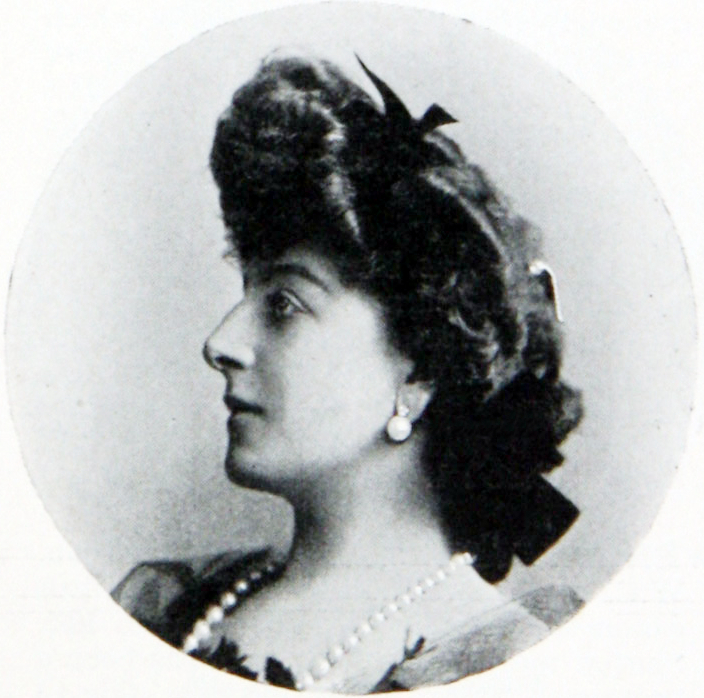
Ada Annie Watney circa 1900.

During the 1890s Claude Watney bought High Elms as his country house. He and his wife Ada lived there until 1911. Sometime during the 1890s the name of the house was changed from High Elms to Garston Manor.

A member of the Watney family of brewers, Claude was born in London in 1866. His father, James Watney, Jr., was a member of Parliament and a wealthy brewer who owned the firm Watney & Co, Ltd. Claude was educated at Eton and Oxford University and then entered the family business where he rose to become Director in 1898. He married Ada in 1895 and the couple seemed to have a fairly active life. They were both interested in motor cars and were mentioned in the motoring journals. One journal mentioned that Claude owned a Pipe car and was an all-round sportsman whose horses were famed for their mettle and speed. The article also mentioned that Ada Watney owned a Pipe, a Panhard and a Mercedes and was one of London's best known lady motorists. Her Pipe car was described as a “most tastefully upholstered car in cream and painted in electric blue with a pretty canopy and bowed glass dust screen".

Ada Watney had a rather unusual life. She was born in 1868 as Ada Annie Nunn and seems to have come from fairly humble parentage. At the age of 21 she married Sherman Martin whose parents were extremely wealthy Americans. At this time he was only 19 and appeared to be leading a rather intemperate life in London. The marriage seems to have been very ill-considered by him and his parents wished him to obtain a divorce. Only a few months after their marriage Sherman returned to America and Ada did not see him again. In 1894 Sherman died possibly because of alcohol-related effects and Ada was free to remarry. In the following year she married Claude and they remained together until his death in 1919. She married again in 1925 and became Mrs Bernard Weguelin. She died in 1938 at the age of 70.

== Residents between 1911 and 1950 ==
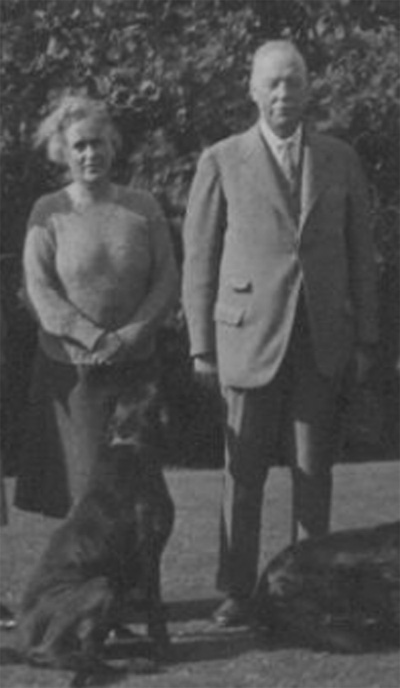
Mrs Doris Briggs and Colonel William Briggs circa 1930.

The Watneys put the house (which was now called Garston Manor) on the market in 1911. It was purchased by Walter William Bourne, who was the founder of the department store Bourne and Hollingsworth.

Walter was born in 1865 in Mucklestone. His father John Bourne was a farmer. He became an apprentice in the drapery trade in Birmingham. During this time he met Howard Hollingsworth and they became close friends. In 1894 they opened the first Bourne and Hollingsworth store in Westbourne Grove and later moved to Oxford St where they established a very large department store.

In 1896 Walter married Howard's sister, Clara Louisa Hollingsworth and the couple had seven children (Molly, Kathleen, Stafford, Christine, Helen, John & Jim). Stafford Bourne later became prominent in the retail business.

In 1921 Walter died at the age of 56 at Garston Manor. The probate register shows that he left a large fortune to his family. Clara retained ownership of Garston Manor until 1932 when she put the house on the market. An advertisement for its sale appeared in The Times.

Colonel William Hilton Briggs and his wife Doris (see photo at right) were the next residents of Garston Manor. At this time William was the managing director of Benskin's Brewery in Watford.

William Hilton Briggs was born in 1871. He was the son of Colonel Charles James Briggs of Hylton Castle, Sunderland. He joined the military forces and at the age of 20 was promoted to lieutenant. He served in the Boer War and some years after was promoted to lieutenant-colonel. He was also served in the First World War and retired after it finished in 1918.

In 1904 he married Doris Kathleen Benskin, who was the daughter of the wealthy brewery owner Thomas Benskin. Doris was born in 1880 to Thomas and Alice Benskin. It is she who is credited with inventing the current Benskin trademark of a waving pennant.

In 1910 William was appointed to the position of Managing Director of Benskins in Watford and he held this position until 1946 when he became Chairman of the company. In 1946 he and Doris bought Brickendon Grange near Hertford.

During the war years the property was heavily defended with "pill" boxes and fortified trenches and three large air raid shelters were built, however there seems to be no record of occupation by presumably one of the services during this period.

== The manor after 1950 ==
In about 1951 Garston Manor was sold to the Hospital Board and it became a rehabilitation centre for many years until it closed in 1997 and was sold to the late Sheila O'Neill. She restored the property and until recently it was a school; her daughters have now put the property on the market.

The manor was used as a film location for various series and movies such as: Nancherrow, Second Sight with Clive Owen, Longitude with Jeremy Irons, Madame Bovary, The Hoobs by Jim Henson, photo shoot for Daily Mail, The Last Client, Featherboy with Sheila Hancock, Combat Sheep – Baby Cow Productions, Ultimate Force with Ross Kemp, Midsomer Murders (used three times), The Schartz Metter Klume Method, Rosemary & Thyme ("Enter Two Gardeners"), The Thieving Headmistress with Pauline Quirke, Chucklevision with the Chuckle Bros., Clandestine, EastEnders, Holby City (used twice), Little Miss Jocelyn, Invisible Eyes, Love at First Sight with John Hurt and Phyllida Law, In Clear Sight, and Morgana.

In 2011, the house was the subject of a Channel 4 television documentary presented by hotelier Ruth Watson as part of her Country House Rescue series. The official renaming as "High Elms Manor" by the Mayor of Watford was shown on the programme, who cut the ribbon amidst a celebratory tea party. Mrs Watson encouraged Mrs O'Neill and three of her four daughters, who taught at the school and still live in the house with their families, to develop their weddings and events business to generate the extra income needed to maintain the house.
