= Lillie Hall =

Coordinates: 51°29′11″N 0°11′43″W

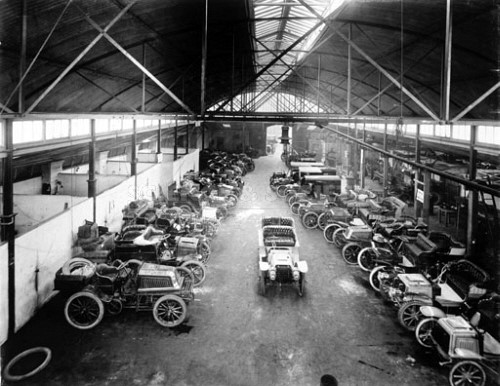
Lillie Hall, 1903

Lillie Hall was a disused roller skating or ice skating rink off Seagrave Road (just south of Roxby Place, next to the rail line), Fulham, London, that in 1902 (or January 1903) became Charles Rolls' first car showroom, to sell imported French Peugeot and Belgian Minerva vehicles. Rolls went on to co-found the Rolls-Royce company in 1906.

== Opening ==
In June 1903, Lord Montagu's father wrote in his Car Illustrated magazine about Charles Rolls and other old Etonians he was at school with who were involved in the motor trade, despite having no need to work for money. As well as Rolls, they included Claude Watney who had opened a showroom in Wardour Street, selling Panhards and Mercedes motor cars.

Rolls received an annual allowance of £500 from his father, who gave him a further £6,600 to start his business, as an advance against the £20,000 he was due to inherit on his father's death, and Lillie Hall opened to the public in 1903 with a "grand reception".

== Operations ==
Together with a showroom, Lillie Hall had a fully equipped garage capable of carrying out all possible repairs, and even a "hospital car" that on receiving a telephone call from a motorist in distress could be dispatched to provide roadside assistance.

Lillie Hall was Rolls' first premises, and by 1906, C.S. Rolls Ltd had leased a showroom in Conduit Street in the West End, which is still used for this purpose by Rolls-Royce.

Staff included Harry Fleck, one of Rolls' early drivers and mechanics, and Bill Frost (1907–1993), a coachwork inspector, who started working at Lillie Hall in 1922, when he recalled a 1906 Heavy 20 being scrapped there.

== Closure ==
Lillie Hall closed in 1968 and Bill Frost arranged the closing ceremony with a Rolls-Royce Silver Shadow outside its "famous doors". It is unclear when Lillie Hall was demolished, but by the time of a 2018 draft London Plan consultation document, it was clearly long since gone.
