= John Scott Lillie =

British Army officer

Sir John Scott Lillie
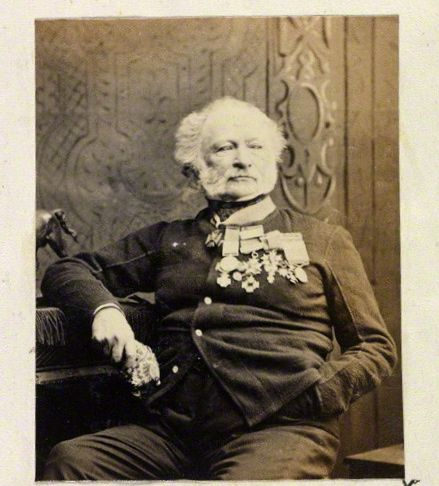
- Sir John Scott Lillie by Camille Silvy c. 1862
- Born: 1790; Ireland
- Died: 1868 (aged 77–78); Kensington, London, England
- Burial place: Brompton Cemetery
- Relatives: General Scott, Duchess of Portland and Viscountess Canning
- Military career
- Allegiance: Kingdom of Great Britain; British Empire; Kingdom of Portugal
- Branch: Army
- Service years: 1807–1818 (1855)
- Rank: Lieutenant-Colonel (UK); Major-General (Portugal)
- Units: 6th Warwickshire Regiment, Grenadier Guards,
- Commands: 7th Cacadores
- Conflicts: Peninsular War; Battle of Bussaco; Torres Vedras Lines; Battle of the Pyrenees; Battle of Nivelle; Battle of Orthez; Battle of Toulouse
- Awards: Army Gold Cross, Decoration of The Lily (France), Military General Service Medal, Knight Bachelor, Companion of the Bath
- Other work: Deputy Lieutenant of the County of Middlesex; Justice of the peace Chairman of Middlesex Quarter Sessions, shareholder in the Hammersmith Bridge Co., Kensington Canal Co., political writer, parliamentary candidate, Patent holder.

Sir John Scott Lillie CB (1790 – 29 June 1868) was an Anglo-Irish decorated officer of the British Army and Portuguese Army who fought in the Peninsular War (1808–1814). He was a landowner, entrepreneur and inventor. He was deputy lieutenant of the County of Middlesex and Chairman of the Middlesex Quarter Sessions, a freemason, a radical politician and supporter of the great Irish statesman Daniel O'Connell. He was an early antivivisectionist and writer.

== Background ==
John Lillie was the eldest son of Philip Lillie Esq., of Drumdoe Castle, County Roscommon and his wife Alicia, née Stafford. One source gives his birth date as 1789. He was heir to properties in Roscommon, Dublin and Bath. The family were said to be related to the Duke of Portland through his mother, Henrietta daughter of General John Scott of Fife, but the connection has yet to be established. Lillie's sister, Alicia, married as his second wife, Hugh Mill Bunbury of Guyana; their daughter became a noted Carmelite nun, while their youngest son, Charles Thomas fought in the Crimean War and was promoted Colonel. Having completed his education, Lillie sought his fortune in the British army. On his return to civilian life, having been thrice wounded in the Peninsular War, Lillie married Louisa Sutherland (b. 1791), daughter of Capt. Andrew Sutherland RN, Commissioner of Gibraltar and his wife Louisa Colebrooke, on 22 January 1820 at St George's, Hanover Square, Middlesex. The Lillies had a daughter and three sons, the youngest of whom, George Arthur Howard, became a Buddhist while out in India as an officer.

== Military career ==
Lillie joined the 6th Warwickshire Regiment of Foot in 1807 as an ensign. The following year he embarked under Sir Brent Spencer in first expeditionary force to Portugal for service in Barbary, Cadiz and the Tagus. He joined the Lusitanian Legion of the Portuguese Army in the rank of captain, when still only 19 years old, under the watchful eye of Lieutenant-General William Carr Beresford, who raised the famous élite corps of light infantry, the Caçadores. Having taken part in engagements in defence of Portugal, Lillie was promoted lieutenant in 1810. He fought at the Battle of Bussaco and took part in the retreat to the Torres Vedras Lines. In 1812 at the Battle of Salamanca, he was reputed to have personally seized the Colours of the 116th French Line Regiment during the struggle for Arapiles. As commander of the 7th Caçadores, he led his troops into the Battle of the Pyrenees, Battle of Nivelle (1813), Battle of Orthez (1814) and finally, the Battle of Toulouse (1814), where he was gravely wounded (for the third time) and left for dead for 48 hours on the battlefield. He was awarded the Decoration of The Lily by the French. By the British he was awarded the Army Gold Cross, (later) he was honoured with the Military General Service Medal. In Wellington's army his progression was somewhat slow; he left the Peninsular War in the rank of major and in 1816 he was knighted by patent. In the 1831 Coronation Honours, he was made a Companion of the Bath. Also that year, Pedro of Portugal, promoted him to the rank of major general in the Portuguese Army. By the time he took formal retirement from the British Army, in 1855, he had attained the rank of lieutenant colonel with the commensurate pension. He left a record of his experiences in the war.

== The entrepreneur and inventor ==
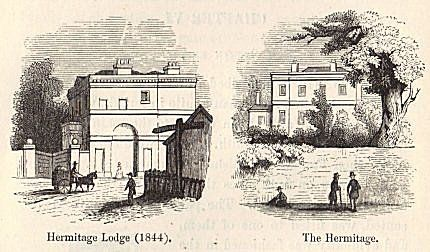
'the Hermitage' and Lodge c. 1840

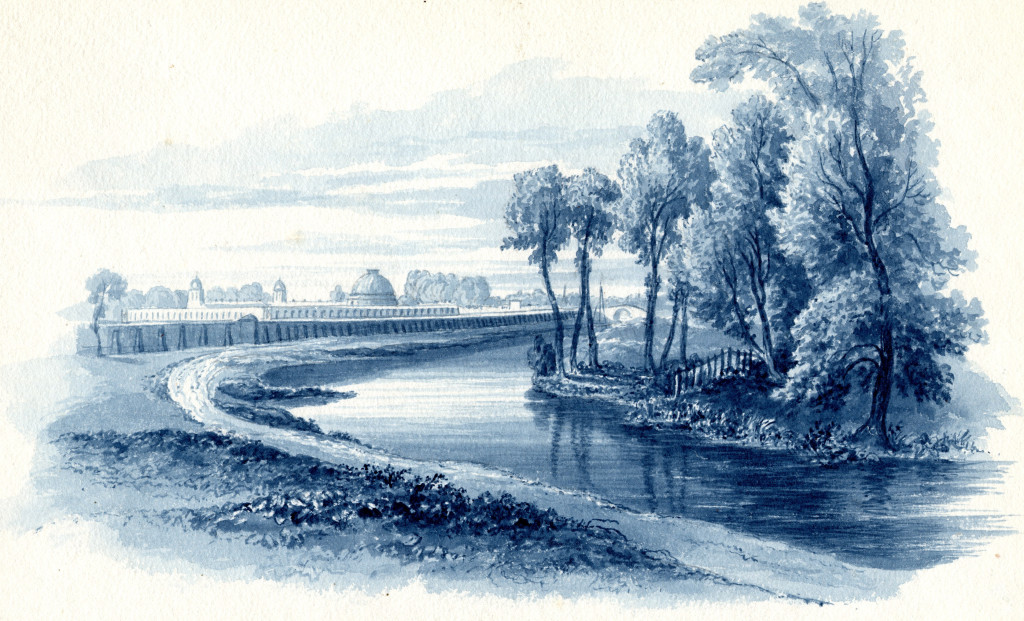
Brompton Cemetery and Kensington Canal by William Cowen

Still employed by the Army, but too disabled to serve and so on half pay, and recently married, he was received into the Prince of Wales (Freemasonry) Lodge (1923). On 'sick leave', Sir John sought to apply his energy and experience in London society. In 1822, he had bought 'the Hermitage', a grand villa once owned by the dramatist, Samuel Foote, with a fourteen-acre estate at North End, in the Parish of Fulham in the County of Middlesex. At that time, his new neighbours, the Edwardes and the Gunters were engaged in catching up with the canal boom and the burgeoning transportation revolution. Lillie, who was already a shareholder in the Hammersmith Bridge project, next became a major investor and actor in the Kensington Canal company, a scheme eventually bitterly opposed by Lord Holland. His strategy was to link the new Hammersmith river crossing with the village of Brompton, further downriver and closer to London. For that purpose, he donated some of his land in 1825 for a new stretch of public highway, joining Crown Lane and North End Lane to Counter's Creek (which was then being developed into the Kensington Canal), and the new canal bridge, built by Gunter.

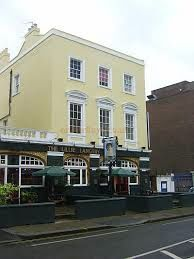
'The Lillie Arms' public house built by Sir John Scott Lillie, 1835

To service the canal and wharf construction on land that are today's Langtry Place, Rickett Street and Roxby Place, he laid out two further stretches of unmade road either side of the new highway, named initially as the Richmond Road. The unmade roads were eventually called Richmond Gardens – later Empress Place – and Seagrave Road in Fulham. Around 1830, he also built the 'North End Brewery' and tavern to the South of the highway, together with a maltings to the north on the shorter stretch, initially managed by a Miss Goslin. To commemorate his development of the area and as its original freeholder, the 1835 tavern became known as the "Lillie Arms" (now renamed 'The Lillie Langtry', after the actress and mistress, among others, of the Prince of Wales). The Fulham stretch of Richmond Road and the canal bridge were eventually renamed Lillie Road and Lillie Bridge respectively. The canal project was dogged by financial difficulties and was an ill-considered venture, whose time had passed. It eventually gave way to the railways, as first one track was laid along the canal, and in the 1860s that was filled in and a second rail track put down.

Sir John Lillie decided to leave North End in 1837 and moved with his family to Chelsea in the County of Middlesex, where he occupied 12, Cheyne Walk, a 'noble' Georgian mansion, to which he made major structural additions. From there, he moved to Kensington, probably in the late 1840s, where he remained to the end of his days.

=== Patent holder ===
During his lifetime, Sir John Scott Lillie took out upwards of 30 patents for all manner of improvements ranging from mechanisms for kneading dough, tilling fields, the chemical composition of stucco to propulsion engines on land and in the water. In 1836, he designed a power unit intended for propelling carriages and barges for which he was granted a patent. His military background influenced his design of the 'Lillie Rifle battery' an early form of machine gun. Aware of the challenges for transport caused by the transformation of open fields into industrialised areas, Lillie applied himself to the creation of durable street paving. He designed a system using layers of wood and asphalt to make it weather-proof and was granted a patent. In 1863, he was a founding member of the 'Institute of Inventors' and took the chair at the first annual general meeting, styled as 'General Sir John Scott Lillie'.

== The politician and activist ==
While living in North End, Fulham, Lillie took up civic duties. He was swept up in the debate over parliamentary reform. In 1831, with the accession of a new king, he published a pamphlet about the redistribution of power in Parliament and the curbing of corruption in the electoral system. He was connected with the Whig politician, John Byng, 1st Earl of Strafford. In January 1835 Sir John Lillie stood for election as a burgess in the borough (constituency) of King's Lynn in the County of Norfolk, but despite loud support, he only managed to come third. His Irish roots and connections led Lillie to an active interest in Catholic emancipation. He was a friend and supporter of Daniel O'Connell. In his role as magistrate, Sir John intervened in 1840 in the matter of 'non-restraint of lunatics' at Hanwell Asylum, where it was reported that a lax approach was leading to self-harm by some patients. The matter was taken up in the press and in The Lancet.

Even in advanced old age, Lillie took a stance against the cruel treatment of animals in experiments, witness his letter to The Lancet in January 1861. He was still writing to the press on the power of musketry in 1866. Sir John Lillie was widowed in May 1860, when his wife Dame Louisa died at Dover. He then married widow Elisabeth Hannah Carew on 26 June 1862 at the British Embassy in Paris. She survived him. He himself died at his residence in Norfolk Terrace, Kensington on 29 June 1868 and was buried at Brompton Cemetery, very close to his earlier efforts on behalf of transport development in Fulham.

== Awards and honours ==
- The Most Honourable Order of the Bath, CB (Great Britain)
- Army Gold Cross, (Great Britain), for Pyrenees, three clasps, Nivelle, Orthez, Toulouse
- Military General Service, (Great Britain) seven clasps, for Battle of Roliça, Battle of Vimeiro, Bussaco, Battle of Badajoz (1812), Battle of Salamanca, Battle of Vitoria and Battle of Nive
- Order of the Tower and Sword, Knight's breast Badge (Portugal)
- Commander's Cross for Five Actions (Portugal): Pyrenees, Nivelle, Nive, Orthez and Toulouse
- Campaign Cross for 4 Years, (Portugal)
- Decoration of the Lily, (France)

=== Honour for rescuing a boy from drowning ===
In 1827 Lillie was on board a paquet in the Thames when it was involved in a collision with the works by the Tower. The boat seems to have disintegrated and sank immediately, leaving passengers and crew in the water. Other craft were quickly despatched to rescue the luckless victims and Lillie, being a strong swimmer, assisted a nine-year-old boy who had been with the party and could not swim. They were both picked and taken to safety. For this act of bravery, Sir John Scott Lillie was honoured by the Royal Humane Society in January 1827.

== Bibliography ==
- Lillie, J.S. and Mayne, William. (2014) The Loyal Lusitanian Legion during the Peninsular War: The Campaign of Wellington's Portuguese Troops, 1809–11 published by Leonaur Ltd.
- Lillie, Sir John Scott. An Historical Sketch of the Origin and Progress of Parliamentary Corruption, and of the evils arising therefrom; in order to prove the ... necessity of parliamentary reform, London: Effingham Wilson, 1831, 86 pages.
- * Polytechnisches Journal. 63. Band, Jahrgang 1837, N.F. 13. Band, Hefte 1-6 komplett. (= 18. Jahrgang, 1.-6. Heft ). Eine Zeitschrift zur Verbreitung gemeinnüziger Kenntnisse im Gebiete der Naturwissenschaft, der Chemie, der Pharmacie, der Mechanik, der Manufakturen, Fabriken, Künste, Gewerbe, der Handlung, der Haus- und Landwirthschaft etc. Herausgegeben von Johann Gottfried und Emil Maximilian Dingler.

Polytechnisches Journal. Hrsg. v. Johann Gottfried Dingler, Emil Maximilian Dingler und Julius Hermann Schultes: Published by Stuttgart in der J. G. Cotta'schen Buchhandlung (1837)., 1837 (in German) - includes Lillie's invention.

== Items named after Lillie ==
- Lillie Road (Fulham)
- Lillie Bridge, rebuilt by rail engineer, Sir John Fowler, 1st Baronet, 1866
- Lillie Bridge Grounds, athletics and cricket grounds in Fulham where a number of records were achieved
- Lillie Hall, the demolished roller-skating rink, behind Seagrave Road, close to the junction with Lillie Road, where the Rolls Royce automotive history began.
- Lillie Rec, The Lillie Road Recreation Ground, a park at the junction with the Fulham Palace Road
- Lillie Bridge Railway Depot, 1872, engineering workshop for London Underground
- Lillie Hall, Seagrave Road, Fulham - briefly a roller-skating venue, then taken over by Charles Rolls (later of Rolls-Royce company) in 1903 as a car showroom (demolished)
- The Lillie Arms 1835 public house in Lillie Road, now renamed after 'Lillie Langtry' (opposite the Arts and crafts public house 'the Prince of Wales' destined for demolition in 2016)
- The Lillie Rifle battery
- Sir John Lillie Primary School (Fulham)

== See also ==
- Napoleonic Wars
- Arthur Wellesley, 1st Duke of Wellington
- History of the British canal system
- Radicals (UK)
- John Byng, 1st Earl of Strafford
- The Westminster Review
