= Reid & Co. =

British brewery

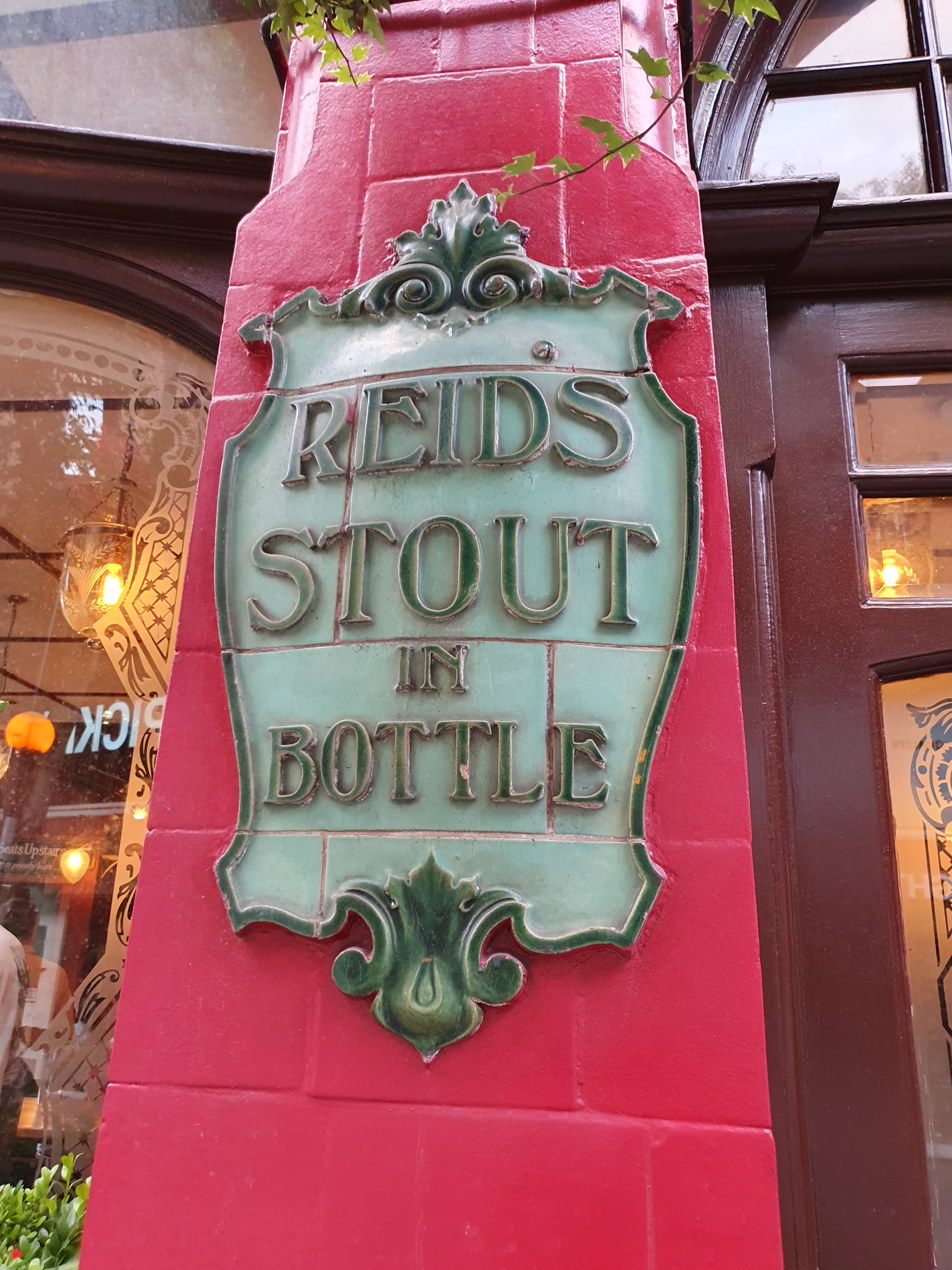
Tiles referencing Reid's Stout on the Crown and Anchor, Covent Garden

Reid & Co was a large British brewery based in London.

== History ==
The business was established in 1757 when Richard Meux and Mungo Murray acquired Jackson's Brewery on Mercer Street. Following a major fire, the Griffin Brewery at Clerkenwell was built in 1763. Andrew Reid, a wealthy merchant and distiller, became a partner in 1793, and the firm began to trade as Meux Reid & Co. Production amounted to over 100,000 barrels for the first time in 1795. The firm was the largest of the London porter breweries in 1807/8. It began to trade as Reid's Brewery from 1816.

Reid's was the fourth largest brewer in London in 1853, as measured by the amount of malt used. The Griffin Brewery was reckoned to be the largest brewery under a single roof in London in 1862. While Richmond and Turton state that the Reid family's involvement with the firm ended with the death of William Reid in 1867, his son Cecil Frederick Reid was a large shareholder and director.

In 1888 the firm became a limited liability company with a registered capital of £2 million. Reid merged with rival London brewers Watney & Combe in 1898. The Griffin Brewery in Clerkenwell was closed.

The Reid brand name continued to be applied to stout until the 1950s.
