= John Watney =

Sir John Watney FSA (27 January 1834 – 25 March 1923), a member of the Watney family, was Honorary Secretary of the City and Guilds of London Institute for the Advancement of Technical Education from 1878 to 1920 and Chairman of Council of the City and Guilds of London Institute from 1921 to 1923.

He was the eldest son of John Watney and Susannah Dormay of Mitcham, Surrey. His uncle was James Watney, brewer and one time Master of the Mercers' Company. He was educated at Harrow and became a solicitor in 1857. In 1864 he married Elizabeth Dendy.

He was appointed as Lieutenant for the City of London, and served for over thirty years as Clerk to the Mercers' Company and to the Gresham Committee, a position from which he retired on 1 February 1907.

He was knighted on 30 June 1900 at Windsor Castle.

== Works ==
- 1871 Some account of St. Osyth's priory, Essex, and its inhabitants, London: Waterlow, privately printed
- 1892 Some Account of the Hospital of St. Thomas of Acon, in the Cheap, London, and of the Plate of the Mercers' Company (2nd edition 1906)
- 1893 Some account of Leigh Place, Surrey, and its owners, London: Roworth
- 1896 Some account of Mercers' school, London: Blades
- 1906 Popular Natural History, London: East & Blades
- 1914 An account of the Mistery of Mercers of the city of London, otherwise the Mercers' Company
- 1914 History of the Mercers' company of the city of London, London: East & Blades
- 1920 A Short Account of the Mercers' Company of London, Compiled by Sir John Watney.
