= James Watney =

English brewer (1800–1884)

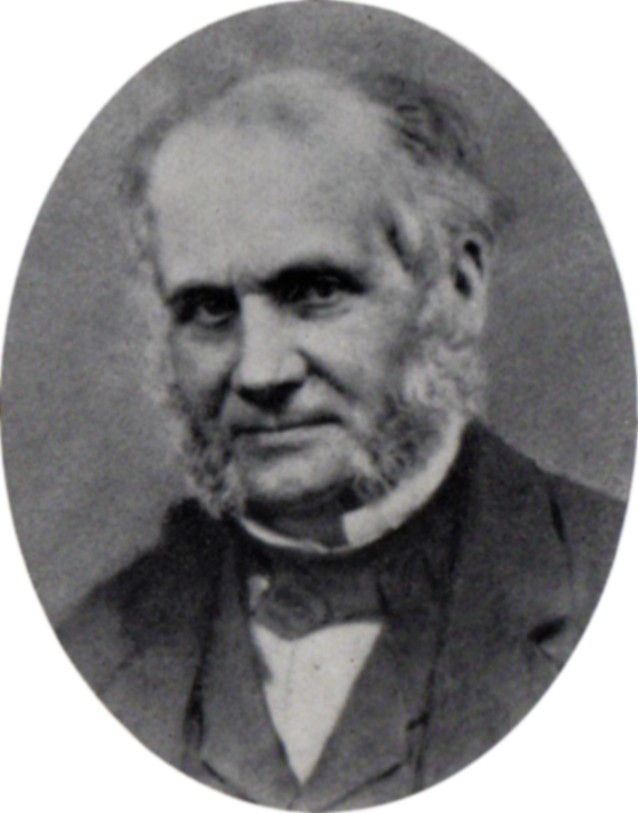
- James Watney portrait
- Born: 18 December 1800; England
- Died: 16 March 1884 (aged 83)
- Occupation: Brewer
- Known for: Stag Brewery of Pimlico
- Notable work: Master of the Mercers' Company
- Spouse: Rebecca Spurrell (m. 1829)
- Children: 4 sons, 5 daughters
- Relatives: John Watney (nephew)

James Watney (18 December 1800 – 16 March 1884) was an English brewer and landowner who resided at Haling Park, Croydon, and Beddington, Surrey.

== Professional life ==
The Watney family were the main partners in the Stag Brewery of Pimlico for much of the 19th century. In 1837, James Watney became a partner in the brewery with John Lettsom Elliot and Charles Lambert, as later did his sons James and Norman in 1856. The brewery was known as Elliot, Watney & Co from about 1849. John L Elliot withdrew from the business in 1850, and for 8 years remained a partner in name only. He finally retired in 1858 and the firm became known as James Watney & Co. James Watney then kept the management almost entirely to himself until his death, at well over eighty years, in 1884. After his death in 1884, Watney & Co Ltd became a private limited company in 1885.

In 1898, it acquired Messrs. Combe Delafield and Co. and Messrs. Reid and Co., and was thereafter known as Messrs. Watney Combe & Reid.

James Watney was Master of the Mercers' Company in 1846, but had few other interests outside business. He contributed several thousands of pounds towards building a new church just as his father had done at Mitcham.

== Family life ==
He was born to Daniel Watney of Mitcham, Surrey and Mary Galpin, daughter of James Galpin of Mitcham, Surrey. He was the grandson of John Watney and great-grandson of Daniel Watney of Wimbledon, Surrey, who was an ale conner.

On 15 October 1829, at St. Saviour's Church, Southwark (now Southwark Cathedral), James Watney married Rebecca Spurrell, elder daughter of the brewer and hop merchant James Spurrell, of Park Street, Southwark, who was employed by Barclay & Perkins's Anchor Brewery, Southwark. They had nine children. All five daughters remained unmarried. Of the four sons, one (Frederick) died young, aged 8 in 1846. The other three were:

- James Watney (1832–1886) of Beddington, Surrey, and Thorney House, Palace Gate, Kensington, was Conservative MP for East Surrey from 1871–1885 and Master of the Mercers' Company in 1879. He also played cricket for Surrey (1851) and Middlesex (1851–1852). Married Blanche Maria Georgiana Burrell in 1856.
- Norman Watney
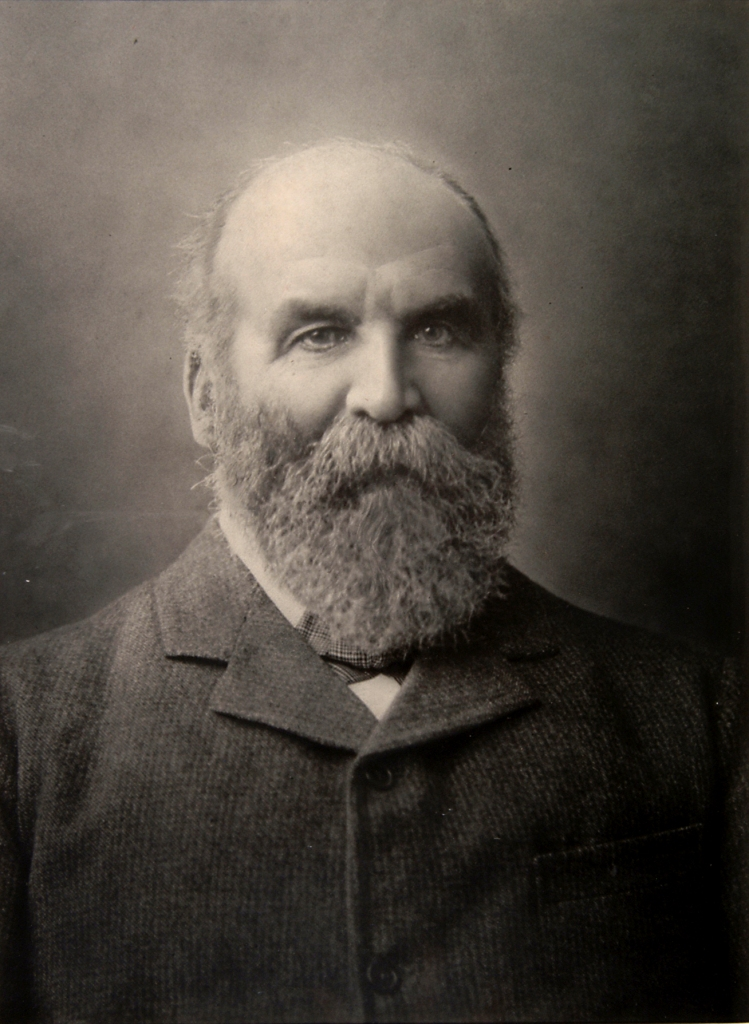
  Norman Watney portrait
  (1834–1911) of Valance, Westerham, Kent, was educated at Harrow. He was a Justice of the Peace and a Deputy Lieutenant for Kent, and also served as Master of the Mercers' Company in 1880. He married Matilda Jane Robinson on 26 April 1866 at Clitheroe, Lancashire. He built Valence, Westerham (now a school) in 1885 and was the father of the missionaries Kate and Constance Watney.
- Herbert Watney (1843–1932) of Buckhold, Pangbourne, Berkshire (now St. Andrew's School), was educated at Rugby and St. John's College, Cambridge. He was Senior Assistant Physician at St George's Hospital, London and Master of the Mercers' Company in 1915. He married Sarah Louisa Rainsford on 22 January 1872 at All Saints Church, Wandsworth, Surrey.

The east window in Emmanuel Church, Croydon was given by his son Norman in 1899 to the Glory of God and in loving memory of his parents James and Rebecca Watney. It was destroyed by enemy action in 1944 and replaced in 1954.

One of his daughters, also called Rebecca, founded a mission chapel in Croydon and another at Horsell in Surrey after moving to nearby Woking in 1893. The Horsell chapel, opened in 1900, became Horsell Evangelical Church.

He was also uncle to John Watney who was secretary to the Mercers Company for many years.

== See also ==
- Master of the Mercers' Company
- Watneys Red Barrel
