= William Evans Rogers =

American businessman and railroad executive

- Born: April 11, 1846; Philadelphia, Pennsylvania, U.S.
- Died: March 10, 1913 (aged 66); New York City, New York, U.S.
- Education: University of Pennsylvania; United States Military Academy
- Spouse: Susan LeRoy Fish (m. 1868; died 1909)
- Children: 6
- Parent(s): William Evans Rogers; Harriette Phoebe Ruggles

William Evans Rogers (April 11, 1846 – March 10, 1913) was an American businessman and railroad executive who married into the Fish family.

== Early life ==
Rogers was born in Philadelphia on April 11, 1846, to William Evans Rogers, a Philadelphia attorney, and Harriette Phoebe (née Ruggles) Rogers. Among his siblings was Cornelia Rogers, who married Captain Samuel Emlen Meigs.

From December 1856 until October 1858, he was educated in Paris, France. In 1861, he entered the University of Pennsylvania with the class of 1865 where he was a member of the Philomathean Society and the University Glee Club.

== Career ==
Rogers, a corporal in the University Light Artillery, left Penn at the close his sophomore year to enter the Union Army during the U.S. Civil War. He became a private in the 1st Troop of Cavalry of the City of Philadelphia. He eventually graduated from the United States Military Academy at West Point in 1867. Following his graduation from West Point, he served as a second lieutenant in the Army Corps of Engineers until he resigned from the Army in 1869.

After retiring from the Army, Rogers moved to Detroit, Michigan, where he entered the lumber business and helped organize Presque Isle County. Rogers City, Michigan, the county seat of Presque Isle, is named in his honor.

In 1875, he moved to Garrison, New York, located just outside of New York City, where he worked as a cotton exporter. In 1883, he was appointed him to the New York State Board of Railroad Commissioners by then Governor, later U.S. President, Grover Cleveland, serving for nine years total of which five were spent as chairman. In 1892, he was admitted to the bar in New York and practiced law.

Later, William Rogers worked for the Delaware, Lackawanna and Western Railroad Company.

== Personal life ==
On February 13, 1868 Rogers was married to Susan LeRoy Fish (1844–1909). Susan was the daughter of Julia (née Kean) Fish and Hamilton Fish, the former Governor of New York and U.S. Secretary of State (under President Ulysses S. Grant). She was also the sister of Nicholas, Hamilton Jr., and Stuyvesant Fish. Together, they were the parents of six children, with one son and three daughters surviving, including:

- Julia Fish Rogers (1868–1938), who married the artist Kenneth Frazier (1867–1949) in 1893.
- Harriette Ruggles Rogers (1870–1963), who married Rev. William Stephen Rainsford, rector of St. George's Church in Stuyvesant Square
- Cornelia Meigs Rogers (b. 1872)
- Hamilton Fish Rogers (1873–1880), who died young.
- William Beverly Rogers (b. 1880), who married Grace Chapin (1885–1960), daughter of former Brooklyn mayor and U.S. Representative Alfred Chapin, in 1908. They divorced in 1920 and she married his cousin, Hamilton Fish III.
- Violet Mabel Rogers (1883–1885), who died young.

In 1892, Roger's wife and several members of their extended families, were included in Ward McAllister's "Four Hundred", purported to be an index of New York's best families, published in The New York Times. Conveniently, 400 was the number of people that could fit into Mrs. Astor's ballroom.

Susan died of pneumonia at their home in New York on Wednesday, January 20, 1909. Rogers died in New York City on Monday, March 10, 1913. They are buried at St. Philip's Church Cemetery in Garrison, New York.

=== Descendants ===
Through his eldest daughter Julia, he was the grandfather of Julia Veronica Frazier (1895–1988), Susan Alice Frazier (b. 1899), and Harriette Cornelia Frazier (b. 1902).

Through his son William, he was the grandfather of Susan Fish Rogers.
