= Henry Frowick =

Member of the Parliament of England

Henry Frowick (died 1459) was an English businessman, landowner, administrator and politician who was five times elected as Member of the Parliament of England for the City of London and twice chosen as the City's Lord Mayor.

== Origins ==
A member of the Frowick family that had been prominent in the City of London for 200 years, he was born after 1377 as the son of Henry Frowick (died 1386), lord of the manor of Old Fold at South Mimms in Middlesex, and his wife Alice Cornwall (died 1416), daughter and heiress of John Cornwall. His elder brother was the MP Thomas Frowick (died 1449). After his father's death, his mother married Thomas Charlton (died 1410) and gave birth to a stepbrother, Sir Thomas Charlton.

== Career ==
A member of the Mercers' Company, he was involved in City administration by 1421 when he was appointed an auditor and then in 1422 was elected as the City's MP, followed by a second election in 1423. Made an alderman in 1424, he was chosen as Master of the Mercers' Company in 1426, the first of five terms. In 1427 he served as Sheriff and from 1429 sat on all royal commissions for the City together with some for Middlesex. In 1435 he was chosen as Lord Mayor, followed in 1437 by a third term as the City's MP.

He had extensive dealings with German merchants, serving as ambassador to the Hanse towns in 1436 and being appointed in 1442 as justice for the German community in London. In 1444 he was chosen for a second term as Lord Mayor and, when elected a fourth time as MP in 1447 for the Parliament to be held at Bury St Edmunds, announced that he would only attend if allotted adequate accommodation. After a fifth term as MP in 1450, he made his will in April 1459, asking to be buried in the church of the Hospital of St Thomas of Acre, and was dead by March 1460 when it was proved.

== Family ==
He married Isabel,(died 1465) widow of William Otes and possibly daughter of William Oliver (died 1432). They had two known children:

- Thomas Frowick (died 1485), later knighted and elected MP, who married Jane Sturgeon and was father of the judge Thomas Frowick.
- Elizabeth Frowick (died after 1459), who married the MP Roger Appleton.
