= Katherine Watney =

British missionary (1870–1958)

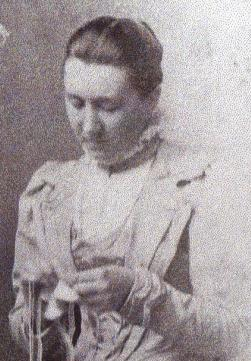
Katherine (Kate) Watney was a CEZMS missionary in China.

Katherine Watney (1870 – 10 January 1958) was a British-born missionary nurse in China.

== Early years ==
Katherine Watney was born on 23 February 1870 in Beddington, Surrey. A member of the Watney family, she was the second daughter of Norman Watney of Westerham, Kent, son of the brewer James Watney. She was commonly called 'Kate'.

Early in life Watney dedicated herself to missionary work, and for this purpose trained as a nurse.

== Missionary work in China ==
Watney was accepted by the CEZMS (Church of England Zenana Missionary Society), a mission which started in India but spread to China. She was sent to China.

In 1922 at the time of the National Christian conference in Shanghai she was in Fuzhou, Fujian province. She was Principal of the Church of England Zenana Mission School for Blind Girls in Nantai.

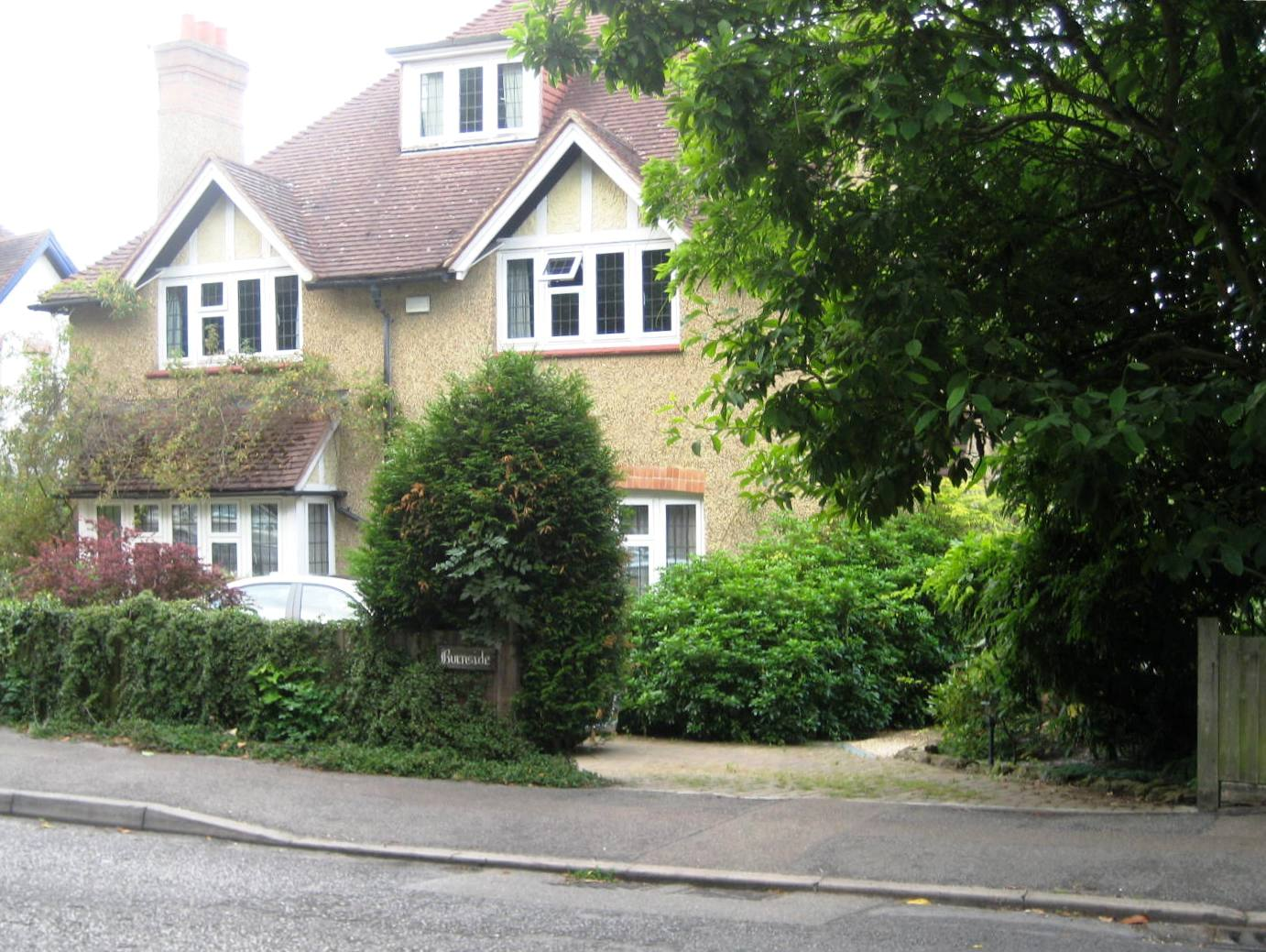
Watney retired to Limpsfield, Surrey where she had a house, Burnside, in Detillens Lane.

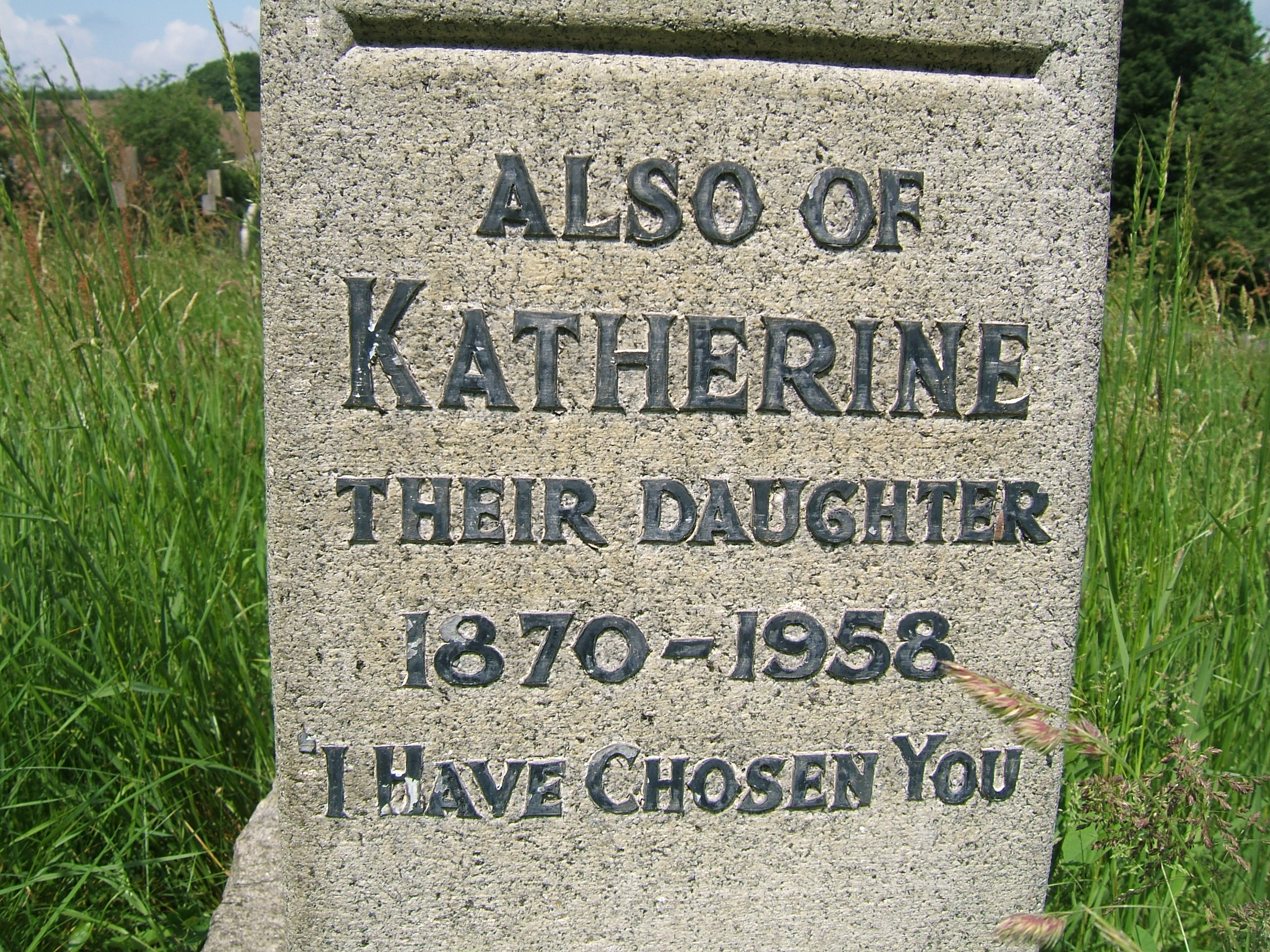
The inscription on Katherine Watney's parents' gravestone in Westerham Churchyard

Watney never married. She retired to Limpsfield, Surrey where she had a house in Detillens Lane. She continued her links with China even in England, and cared for many Chinese children.

She died on 10 January 1958 at the Oxted and Limpsfield Hospital, and was buried in Westerham, Kent.

== Missionary heritage ==
Watney's sister Constance Watney was a missionary in Uganda with CMS (Church Missionary Society). Her niece, Faith, was a missionary with CMS in Sudan, and married Leonard Sharland. Two of their sons, Roger and David, have also been missionaries in Sudan, as is their grandson, Emmanuel.
