= Claude Watney =

British brewery director and motor dealer

- Born: 4 November 1866
- Died: 7 November 1919 (aged 53)
- Education: Eton College
- Alma mater: New College, University of Oxford
- Occupations: Brewery director and motor dealer
- Board member of: Watney Combe & Reid
- Spouse: Ada Annie Watney
- Relatives: James Watney junior (father)

Claude Watney (4 November 1866 – 7 November 1919) was a British brewery director and motor dealer.

He was member of the Watney family of brewers, director of the brewing firm Watney Combe & Reid, and a motor dealer and enthusiast. In 1903 he had a showroom in London selling Panhard and Mercedes motor cars. He owned a Pipe vehicle, and his wife Ada was also an enthusiastic motorist. He was a member of the committee of the Automobile Club of Great Britain and Ireland, which became the Royal Automobile Club.

== Early life ==
Claude Watney was born in London, England, on 4 November 1866, the second son of the brewer and politician James Watney junior and his wife, Blanche Maria Georgiana Burrell. He was educated at Eton College, and New College, University of Oxford.

== Career ==
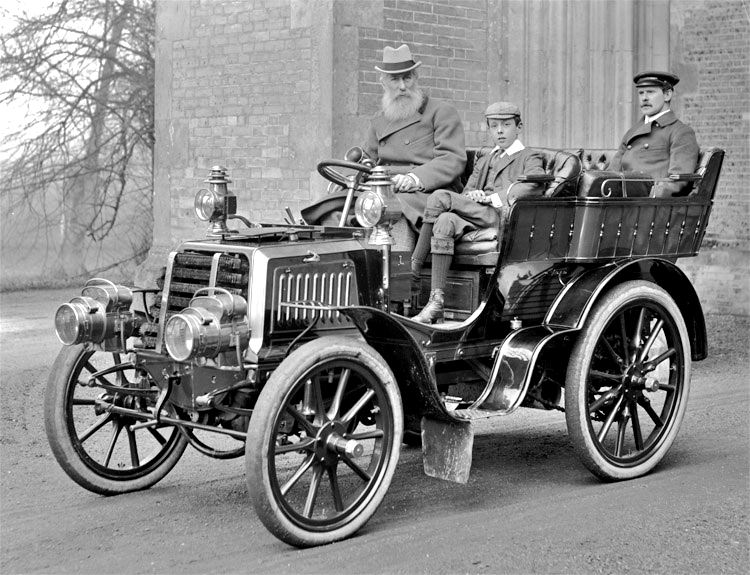
A Panhard vehicle, c.1902

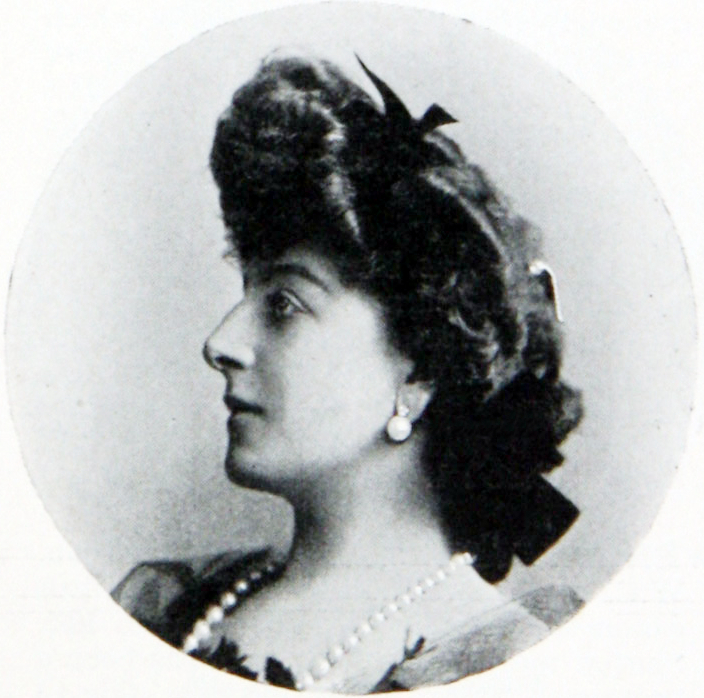
Ada Watney, c.1904

Watney entered the family brewing firm early in his life when it was Watney & Co. His brother, Vernon Watney, was at that time chairman of the firm. When the firm merged with Combe & Co. and Reid's Brewery Company to become Watney Combe Reid, he remained a director of the enlarged entity. By the time of his death in 1919 he was deputy chairman.

== Motoring ==
Watney was keenly interested in motor cars, and in June 1903 John Scott Montagu wrote in The Car Illustrated about Charles Rolls, Watney and other Old Etonians he was at school with who were involved in the motor trade, despite having no need to work for money. The magazine noted that Watney had showrooms in Wardour Street, selling Panhard and Mercedes motor cars.

The 1904 Motoring Annual and Motorist's Year Book described Watney as owning a Pipe motor car (a Belgian model) and being an "all-round sportsman" with his horses "famed for their mettle and speed". He was a member of the committee of the Automobile Club of Great Britain and Ireland which became the Royal Automobile Club.

== Personal life ==
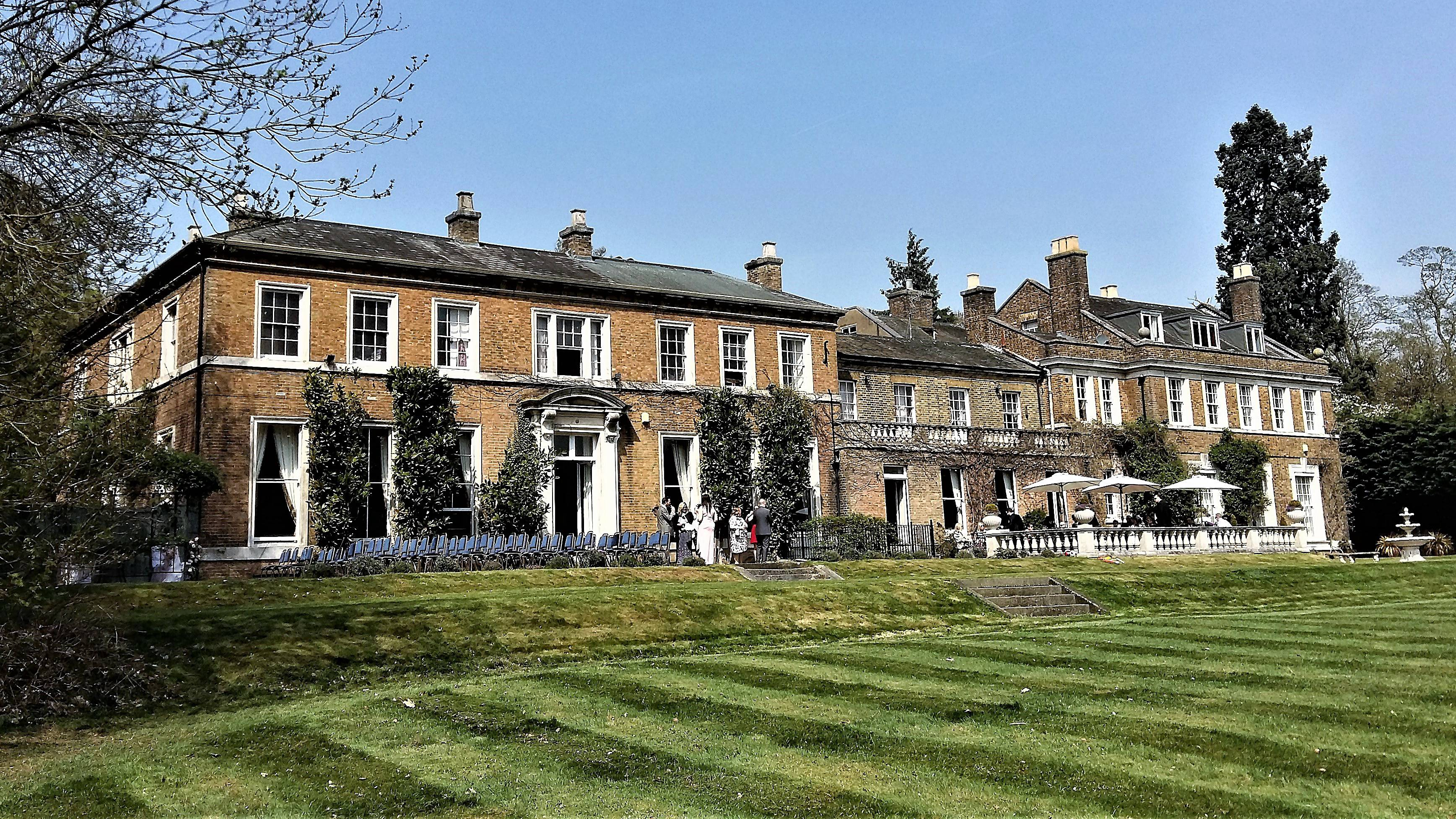
Garston Manor, Hertfordshire

Watney married Ada Annie Watney (1868–1938), in 1895. She had an English father and a Portuguese mother and was described in the American press as a former ballet dancer. She had already been married to the banking heir Sherman Martin when they were both very young. Martin's family disapproved of the union and wished a divorce, for which Ada was said by the press to have asked $10,000, but he died in 1894 still married. A 1909 photo caption described Ada as "of medium height, fair complexion, golden-brown hair and grey-blue eyes" and "very fond of fishing, riding and driving, and is a very keen motorist".

In the late 1890s, Watney moved to 20 Charles Street, Mayfair, London, which became the family home. By 1901, he employed 12 servants. During the First World War, it was announced that Ada had turned part of the house into a nursing home for officers "furnished and equipped with every requirement of modern surgery, and fully staffed by trained sisters and nurses". It had the capacity to treat 18 officers and each was free to choose their own surgeon.

Watney also owned High Elms Manor, later Garston Manor, in Garston, Hertfordshire, which was placed for sale in 1911. He also acquired Mervil Hill, a house in Hambledon, Surrey, that had been owned since 1904 by the astronomer John Franklin-Adams. The house was used as a convalescent home for soldiers during the First World War, and in 1929 it was transferred by Ada, by then a widow, to the Sisters of the Sacred Hearts of Jesus and Mary, who turned it into St Dominic's School, a "residential school for delicate boys".

== Death ==
Watney died at his home of 20 Charles Street on 7 November 1919. His funeral was held at Woking cemetery, where his father was also buried. He left an estate of £573,088 including a collection of coaching prints which were sold at auction by Christie's. His widow subsequently married the motorist Bernard Weguelin.
