= Constance Watney =

British missionary nurse

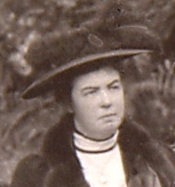
Constance Watney, taken during a family get together

Constance Watney, MBE, COC, SRN, MBCN (1878 – 23 November 1947), was a British born missionary nurse in Uganda.

== Early years ==
Constance Watney was born in 1878 in Beddington, Surrey. A member of the Watney family, she was the fourth daughter of Norman Watney of Westerham, Kent, son of the brewer James Watney. Early in life Constance dedicated herself to missionary work, and for this purpose trained as a nurse at St Bartholomew's Hospital. In 1906 she went as a student of midwifery to Clapham Maternity Hospital, 41-43 Jeffreys Road, Clapham, London, a pioneering hospital training women for work both at home and abroad, and took her CMB Examination.

== Missionary work in Uganda ==
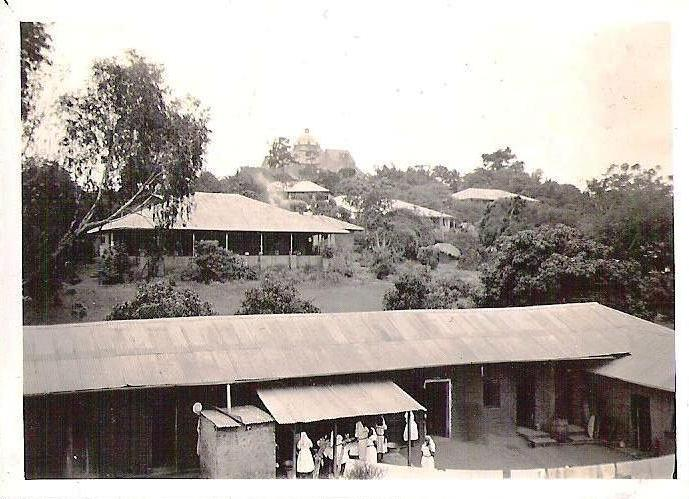
View taken from Maternity Hospital, Mengo Hospital, Kampala 1936

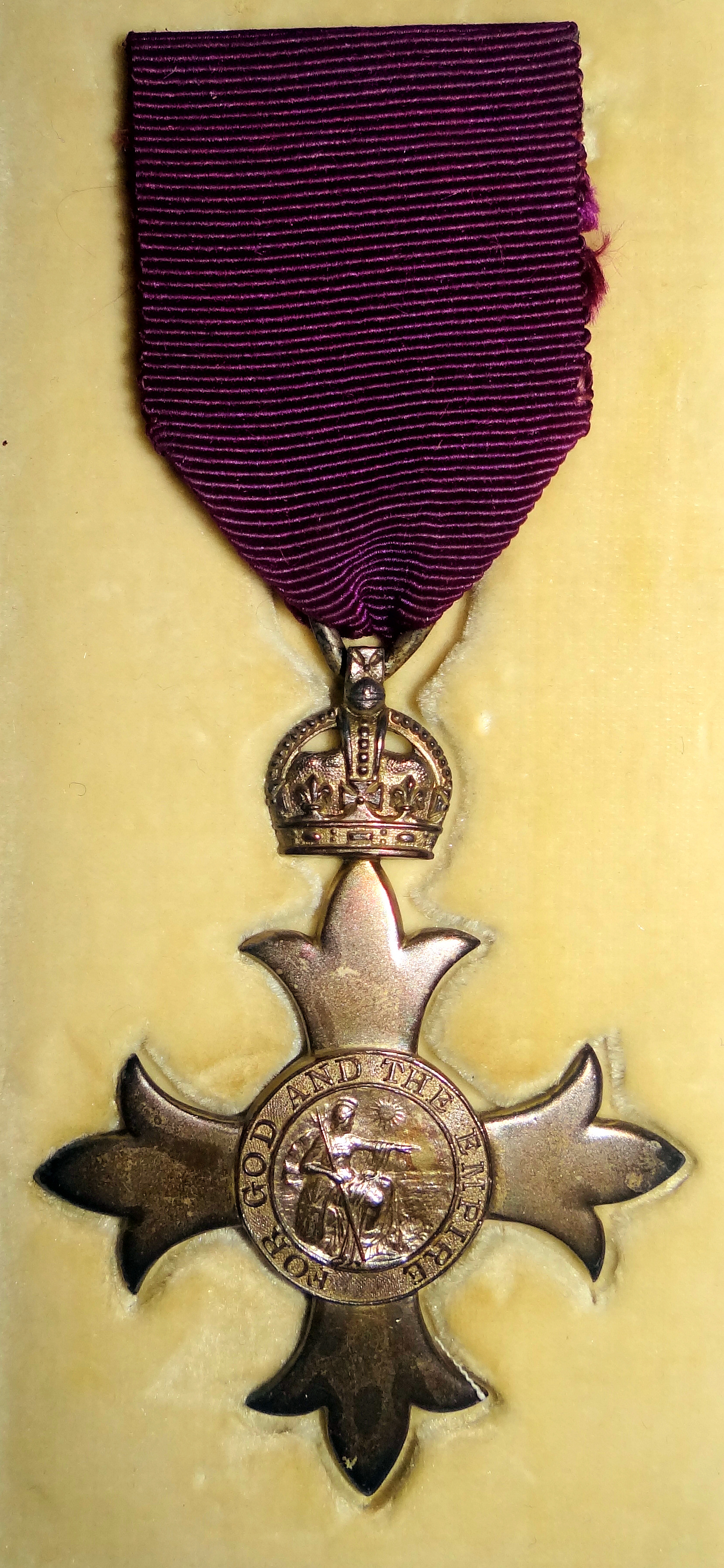
In 1918 Mengo hospital, in addition to its missionary work, served as a base hospital for the fighting in East Africa, and for her share of the very heavy work “ Sister Connie,” as she was called, received the MBE

In 1908 Constance was accepted by the Church Missionary Society (C.M.S.) and sent out to Kampala, Uganda, where she worked in the Mengo Hospital, under Dr Sir Albert Ruskin Cook. Albert Cook was a contemporary at Trinity College, Cambridge of her brother, Arthur Norman Watney, so they may have met through him. In 1917 Mengo hospital, in addition to its missionary work, served as a base hospital for the fighting in East Africa, and for her share of the very heavy work, "Sister Connie", as she was called, received the MBE in 1918.

For nursing an official of the Belgian Government, Sister Connie was awarded the honour of Croix de l’Ordre de la Couronne (Order of the Crown (Seventh Class).

In May 1921, Watney joined Dr Algernon Stanley Smith (who had been brought up by Constance's maiden aunts, Alice and Emily Watney in South Croydon after the death of his mother when he was only one year old) and Dr Len Sharp at Kabale, southwest Uganda, where they a new beginning was made for missionary work into Ruanda, in Belgian territory. She helped to start a hospital at a place called Kabira, where she was the first matron, under very difficult conditions and they were able to receive the first patient in June 1922. The first building had 12 beds but then expanded to 50 when the hospital was officially opened in 1922. In 1923 there were 73 beds for men, 40 for women; in that year they had 705 inpatients and conducted 181 operations.

== Invalided home ==
In 1923 Sister Connie contracted a very severe form of Bright's disease and was invalided home, never to return. She was told her life must henceforth be that of an invalid, but her heart was too much in nursing to give it up. She registered as a nurse in London on 18 May 1923 and went back to Clapham, where she had received her maternity training, and worked in various capacities there under Dr Annie McCall until the hospital was bombed in 1940. She then moved to Highcote, Sutton Valence, near Maidstone, Kent and died on 23 November 1947.

== Family ==
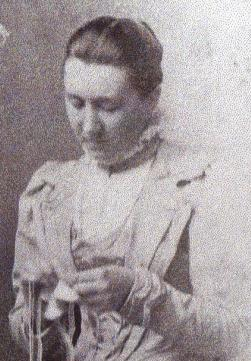
Katherine (Kate) Watney, Connie's sister, who was a CEZMS missionary in China

Constance's sister Kate was a missionary in China with CEZMS (Church of England Zenana Missionary Society). Her niece, Faith, was a missionary with CMS in Sudan, and married Leonard Sharland. Two of their sons, Roger and David, have also been missionaries in Sudan, as is their grandson, Emmanuel.
