= Watney family =

English family involved in brewing and politics

The Watney family is an English family known for its association with the brewing firm Watney Combe & Reid, as well as for its political activities, philanthropy and missionary work. Members include:

- James Watney (1800–1884), brewer
- James Watney Jr. MP (1832–1886), brewer and politician
- Herbert Watney (1843–1932), physician
- Sir John Watney (1834–1923), knight and charity secretary
- Vernon Watney (1860-1928), son of James Watney Jr.
- Claude Watney (1866–1919), brewer and motor dealer
- Katherine Watney (1870–1958), missionary
- Constance Watney (1878–1947), missionary

Also related to the Watneys by marriage are:

- Joseph Gurney Barclay (1879–1976), son-in-law of Herbert Watney
- Oliver Rainsford Barclay (1919–2013), grandson of Herbert Watney
- Rev. William Stephen Rainsford (1850–1933), brother-in-law of Herbert Watney
- Ada Annie Watney (née Nunn) (1868–1938), wife of Claude Watney
