= Herbert Watney =

British physician and philanthropist (1843–1932)

Herbert Watney (1843–1932) of Buckhold, Pangbourne, Berkshire (now St. Andrew's School) was a nineteenth century London physician, landowner and philanthropist, and a strong supporter of Christian missions.

== Early life ==
Herbert Watney was born on 15 December 1843 at Wandsworth, Surrey the son of James Watney of Haling Park, Croydon, Surrey. He was educated at Rugby and St. John's College, Cambridge. As an undergraduate, he was a rowing blue and rowed three times for Cambridge University, in the losing crews of 1865, 1866 and 1867, and won the Colquhoun Sculls Cup. He took his BA is 1866 and MA in 1869. He went on to St George’s Hospital, London where he graduated in 1870, also studying medicine at University College, at Jena and at Würzburg. He qualified as MRCS in 1876.

== Professional life ==
After holding the customary resident appointments at St George's Hospital, London he was made Senior Assistant Physician and joint lecturer on physiology from 1881 to 1883. He joined the Physiological Society in 1881: for a period he was engaged in research on the thymus with Burdon Sanderson at University College London and Klein at the Brown Institute. However, shortly after his election as an F.R.C.P. in 1883 and after acting as an Examiner in physiology for the college and for Cambridge, he retired from his professional career.

He was Master of the Mercers' Company in 1915.

After retiring as a physician he devoted himself for the remainder of his long life to his estate at Buckhold in Berkshire, where he became known as an expert on afforestation and pedigree cattle and for his generosity in installing a water supply for neighbouring villages. He was particularly known for his pedigree Jersey herd from which be won numerous gold medals for the butter content of the milk.

He took over the running of the Bradfield village school in the 1880s purchasing the building in 1884. Although this was a board school it was always known as Dr Watney's School. He also catered for the villagers' recreational needs by laying out a cricket pitch with a fine brick pavilion.

While working at St George's Hospital he lived in Wilton Crescent. He built the family mansion at Buckhold near Pangbourne in Berkshire in 1885. Having acquired the Quinta Magnolia estate (later the British Country Club and now a public park) in Madeira in 1895, he spent much of the winter there, developing the gardens and filling them with a variety of exotic plants.

== Philanthropic activities ==
Watney met William S. Rainsford working in a Mission in the East End of London in 1868, and as a result they arranged the emigration of 800 people to Canada. Together they crossed Canada with sparse equipment.

Herbert Watney was an ardent churchman, a supporter of missions overseas and, although a member of the Watney family of brewers, was a strict teetotaller. His four youngest children were Christian Missionaries in China, Japan and Northern Rhodesia respectively, three of them following in their father's footsteps as doctors. He made an epic journey overland in 1913/14 to visit the three in China and Japan.

He accumulated a large collection of rare Bibles.

== Family ==
Watney married Sarah Louisa Rainsford, daughter of Rev. Marcus Rainsford of Belgrave Chapel, on 22 January 1872 at All Saints Church, Wandsworth, Surrey. She was the sister of his friend William S. Rainsford.

They had two sons and six daughters (one of whom died as a child). Four of his children were missionaries.

- May Evelyn Watney (1873–1953) never married but after her mother's death in 1896 helped bring up her younger siblings and cared for her father till his death.
- Winifred Eva Watney (1879–1927) also never married and assisted May in caring for the family, until she died in Northern Rhodesia while visiting her brother Martyn.
- Dora Muriel Watney (1882–1975) was a doctor trained at the London School of Medicine for Women. First on her own from about 1910 and later with her husband, Hammie (Hamlet George) Thompson, she was a missionary in Western China.
- Lilian Enid Watney (1883–1933) was also trained at the London School of Medicine for Women and was a missionary Doctor with China Inland Mission in China.
- Gwendoline Rose Watney (1885–1976), independently with YWCA and later with her husband, Joseph Gurney Barclay, was a missionary in Kjimachi, Tokyo, Japan.
- Martyn Herbert Watney (1887–1972) was a South Africa General Mission medical missionary who ran a mission at ‘Lukuti’ Khaba Hill, Northern Rhodesia, now Zambia (1920–1930).

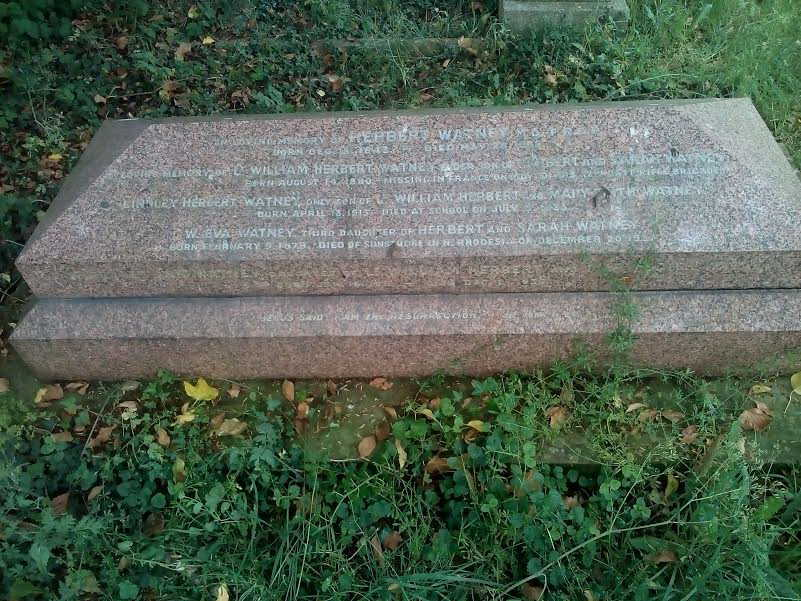
Herbert Watney's grave in Stanford Dingley, Berkshire

Sarah died in 1896 and Watney died on 28 May 1932 and is buried in Stanford Dingley, Berkshire where there is a marble grave which is also a memorial to other members of the family.

== See also ==
- Master of the Mercers' Company
- Watneys Red Barrel
