= Morgana (film) =

- Directed by: Josie Hess; Isabel Peppard
- Produced by: Karina Astrup
- Starring: Morgana Muses
- Cinematography: Josie Hess; Isabel Peppard; Gerald Thompson
- Edited by: Jules De Ruvo
- Release date: 2019
- Country: Australia
- Language: English

Morgana is a 2019 feature documentary about Morgana Muses, a pornographic film star in her 50s. The film is directed by Isabel Peppard and Josie Hess, and produced by Karina Astrup of House of Gary. The film premiered at Melbourne International Film Festival. in August 2019.

== Production ==
The film had a successful Kickstarter campaign that was completed in August 2017 During this time, the project was covered by The Feed (Australian TV series) on SBS Viceland with Marc Fennell.

== Release ==
Morgana had its North American premiere at Fantasia Film Festival in August 2020. The official trailer was launched as an exclusive on Indiewire on August 6, and the film was acquired by Juno Films on August 27.

== Critical reception ==
On Rotten Tomatoes, the film holds an approval rating of 100% based on 17 reviews, with an average rating of 7.80/10. Michele Galgana writing for Screen Anarchy said "Filmmakers Peppard and Hess craft a fantastic documentary with a clear story, that while extraordinary, deeply relatable and touching." Anthony O'Connor writing for FilmInk said Morgana is "A poetic, moving, life-affirming yarn extolling the virtues of sex positivity and self expression."
