= Master of the Mercers' Company =

List of Master Mercers

The Master Mercers of the Worshipful Company of Mercers have been, by reign:

== Richard II of England ==
1390 John Lovey
1391 John Organ
1392 John Organ
1393 John Organ
1394 William Parker
1395 Sir Richard Whittington (1st term)
1396 John Shadworth
1397 John Woodcocke
1398 William Walderne
1399 Walter Cotton

== Henry IV of England ==
1400 John Moore
1401 Sir Richard Whittington (2nd term)
1402 William Parker
1403 John Shadworth
1404 William Walderne
1405 Thomas Fawconer
1406 Stephen Spelman
1407 John Woodcocke
1408 Sir Richard Whittington (3rd term)
1409 John Shadworth
1410 William Walderne
1411 Thomas Fawconer
1412 John Lane

== Henry V of England ==
1413 Stephyn Spelman
1414 Walter Cotton
1415 Thomas Aleyn
1416 John Coventre
1417 Thomas Fawconer
1418 William Walderne
1419 John Lane
1420 John Butler
1421 Thomas Aleyn
1422 John Coventre

== Henry VI of England ==
1423 Thomas Fawconer
1424 William Estfeld
1425 Henry Frowick
1426 William Melrith
1427 John Whatley
1428 William Estfeld
1429 Henry Frowick
1430 Robert Large
1431 William Melreth
1432 John Olney
1433 William Estfeld
1434 Henry Frowick
1435 Robert Large
1436 Thomas Wandesford
1437 John Olney
1438 William Melreth
1439 Thomas Chalton
1440 William Estfeld
1441 Henry Frowick
1442 John Olney
1443 William Melreth
1444 Thomas Chalton
1445 Thomas Wandesford
1446 Richard Riche
1447 Jeffrey Feldyng
1448 Henry Frowick
1449 William Cantlowe
1450 Hugh Wiche
1451 John Midelton
1452 Jeffrey Feldyng
1453 Jeffrey Boleyn
1454 John Olney
1455 William Cantlowe
1456 Hugh Wiche
1457 John Midelton
1458 Raff Verney
1459 Hugh Wiche
1460 Richard Nedeham

== Edward IV ==
1461 William Cantlowe
1462 John Stocketon
1463 Ralph Verney
1464 John Lambert
1465 John Tate
1466 John Midleton
1467 Hugh Wiche
1468 John Stocketon
1469 Thomas Muschampe
1470 Ralph Verney
1471 John Browne
1472 Richard Gardener
1473 John Warde
1474 John Midleton
1475 Ralph Verney
1476 John Browne
1477 Richard Rawson
1478 Richard Gardener
1479 Henry Colet
1480 Thomas Ilom
1481 Robert Tate
1482 John Mathewe

== Edward V ==
Edward V was held in the Tower of London as King for about two months prior to his untimely demise and made no appointments.

== Richard III of England ==
1483 Richard Rawson
1484 John Browne
1485 Richard Gardener

== Henry VII of England ==
1486 John Tate
1487 Hugh Clopton
1488 Henry Colet
1489 Robert Tate
1490 John Mathewe
1491 John Browne
1492 John Tate
1493 William Purchase
1494 Henry Colet
1495 Nicholas Alwyn
1496 William Browne
1497 Robert Tate
1498 Thomas Wyndowte
1499 Richard Haddon
1500 John Tate
1501 John Hawe
1502 Thomas Bradbury
1503 William Browne
1504 Henry Colet
1505 Cristofre Hawe
1506 William Browne
1507 Richard Haddon
1508 John Tate

== Henry VIII ==
1509 John Hawe
1510 James Yarford
1511 Nicholas Shelton
1512 Roger Basford
1513 William Browne
1514 Thomas Baldry
1515 John Aleyn
1516 John West
1517 Thomas Seymer
1518 James Yarford
1519 Roger Basford
1520 Mighell Englissh
1521 John Kyme
1522 Raff Dodmer
1523 Thomas Baldry
1524 John Aleyn
1525 Thomas Seymer
1526 James Yarford
1527 Mighell Englissh
1528 William Holles
1529 Raff Waryn
1530 Mighell Dormer
1531 William Dauntese
1532 Sir Richard Gresham
1533 Richard Reynolde
1534 Thomas Kytson
1535 Nicholas Leveson
1536 John Aleyn
1537 Sir John Gresham
1538 Sir Richard Gresham
1539 William Wilkynson
1540 John Fayere
1541 Raff Waryn
1542 Sir Rowland Hill (1st term)
1543 Richard Jervyes
1544 Mighell Dormer
1545 Sir John Gresham
1546 Robert Chertsey

== Edward VI ==
1547 William Locke
1548 Richard Gresham
1549 Sir Rowland Hill (2nd term)
1550 Richard Jervyes
1551 William Robyns
1552 Sir John Gresham

== Mary I ==
1553 Sir Thomas Leigh
1554 Sir Rowland Hill (3rd term)
1555 Sir John Gresham
1556 Richard Mallore
1557 Roger Martyn
1558 Sir Thomas Leigh

== Elizabeth I ==
1559 Humphrey Baskerfelde (Humphrey Baskerville)
1560 Sir Rowland Hill (4th term)
1561 Richard Mallore
1562 Roger Martin
1563 Sir Thomas Leigh
1564 Richard Mallore
1565 William Allen
1566 Lionel Duckett (1511-1587) (1st term)
1567 Roger Martin
1568 Sir Thomas Leigh
1569 Sir Thomas Gresham (1st term)
1570 William Allen
1571 Lionel Duckett (1511-1587) (2nd term)
1572 Roger Martin
1573 Sir Thomas Gresham (2nd term)
1574 Vincent Randolle
1575 Thomas Ryvette
1576 William Allen
1577 Lionel Duckett (1511-1587) (3rd term)
1578 Richard Barnes
1579 Sir Thomas Gresham (3rd term) (Obit.) / Thomas Ryvette
1580 Ambrose Smythe
1581 Jophn Haydon
1582 William Allen
1583 Lionel Duckett (1511-1587) (4th term)
1584 Richard Barnes
1585 William Elkyn
1586 Thomas Heaton
1587 Thomas Egerton MP
1588 William Birde
1589 Edmond Hogan
1590 Thomas Cranfield
1591 William Elkyn
1592 Henry Rowe
1593 Henry Isham
1594 Thomas Bennett
1595 Thomas Cordell
1596 Bauldwin Derham
1597 Thomas Owen
1598 Henry Rowe
1599 Bartholomew Barnes
1600 William Quarles
1601 Thomas Bennett
1602 Henry Rowe

== James VI and I ==
1604 Thomas Cordell
1605 William Walthall
1606 William Quarles
1607 Henry Rowe
1608 William Higges
1609 Thomas Bennett
1610 Baptist Hickes
1611 Thomas Cordell (Obit.), Thomas Walthall
1612 Thomas Edwardes
1613 Thomas Bennett
1614 Edward Barnes
1615 Lionel Cranfield
1616 William Halliday
1617 William Quarles
1618 Thomas Bennett
1619 John Poole
1620 William Ferrers
1621 Baptist Hickes
1622 Lionel Cranfield, Baron Cranfield (later Earl of Middlesex)
1623 William Halliday (Obit.), Thomas Bennett
1624 William Russell

== Charles I of England ==
1625 John Poole
1626 Raph Stint
1627 Rowland Backhouse
1628 Frauncis Fuller
1629 Henry Rowe
1630 John Bankes (Obit.), Nicholas Asquith
1631 John Cordell
1632 Hugh Perry
1633 Edward Cropley
1634 Raph Stint
1635 William Russell
1636 Rowland Backhouse
1637 Thomas Atkin
1638 Henry Rowe
1639 William Honywood
1640 Francis Flyer
1641 Robert Gardner
1642 John Cordell
1643 Edward Cropley
1644 Thomas Atkin
1645 Henry Rowe
1646 William Honywood
1647 Francis Flyer
1648 John Cordell

== Commonwealth of England ==
1649 John Dethick
1650 Richard Clutterbuck
1651 Anthony Bedingfield
1652 George Wynne
1653 Samuel Moyer
1654 Edmund Sleigh
1655 Samuel Mico
1656 William Barker
1657 Isaack Lee
1658 Richard King
1659 William Cowper

== Charles II of England ==
1660 Thomas Chambrelan
1661 Richard Ford
1662 Rowland Wynn
1663 James Hawley
1664 Henry Spurstowe
1665 Thomas Culling
1666 John Godden
1667 Thomas Carleton
1668 John Dethick
1669 Richard Clutterbuck
1670 John Dogett
1671 Samuel Moyer
1672 William Barker
1673 Thomas Papillon
1674 Richard Ford
1675 Rowland Wynn
1676 John Peake
1677 John Dogett
1678 John Chapman
1679 George Sitwell
1680 Nicholas Cooke
1681 Edward Bouverie
1682 Thomas Papillon
1683 Dudley North
1684 Benjamin Thorowgood

== James II of England ==
1685 William Gostlyn
1686 John Peake
1687 William Ivatt (removed by Order in Council), George Sitwell
1688 William Hedges

== William III of England and Mary II ==
1689 William Ivatt
1690 Edward de Bouverie
1691 Sir William Gore
1692 Thomas Papillon
1693 Benjamin Thorowgood
1694 Thomas Langham
1695 William Ivatt
1696 John Wolfe
1697 Sir William Gore
1698 Thomas Papillon
1699 Edmond Harrison
1700 William Hedges
1701 Samuel Moyer

== Anne, Queen of Great Britain ==
1702 John Morine
1703 Joseph Wolfe
1704 John Brand
1705 William Hurt
1706 Nathaniell Houlton
1707 Jasper Clotterbooke
1708 Thomas Blackmore (Obit.), Edward Carleton
1709 Edward Carleton
1710 William Bridges
1711 John Terry
1712 Richard Bowater
1713 Samuell Mayne

== George I of Great Britain ==
1714 Benjamin Smith
1715 Thomas Serocold
1716 Charles Cooke MP
1717 Richard Chauncy
1718 George Banister
1719 Isaac Grevill
1720 Nicholas Hillyard
1721 John Spillett
1722 Sir Richard Levett
1723 John Williams
1724 Francis Porten
1725 James Colebrooke
1726 John Lock

== George II of Great Britain ==
1727 Thomas Lombe
1728 Eleazer Hassell
1729 John Jones
1730 William Jolliff
1731 John Wallis
1732 Barrington Eaton
1733 Michael Willersdon
1734 Wight Woolley
1735 David Petty
1736 Nathaniel Newnham
1737 Richard Chiswell
1738 Benjamin Moyer
1739 Nathaniel Garland
1740 John Eaton
1741 William Payne
1742 John Nodes
1743 Robert Atkyns
1744 John Rogers
1745 John Sadleir
1746 John Daye
1747 William Dunster
1748 John Brice
1749 John Purcas (Obit.), John Daye
1750 Thomas Morson
1751 Stevens Totton
1752 Stevens Totton
1753 Joseph South
1754 Timothy Helmsley
1755 William Tennant
1756 George Major
1757 Thomas Godfrey
1758 Rowland Winn
1759 Thomas Howes
1760 Thomas Howes

== George III ==
1761 Edward Neale (Obit.), Joseph South
1762 William Knight
1763 John Grubb
1764 Joseph Godfrey (Obit.), Joseph South
1765 Jeremiah Gardiner
1766 John Hookham
1767 Samuel Mason
1768 Charles Buxton
1769 James Townsend
1770 Stephen Hervey
1771 Nathaniel Newnham
1772 Thomas King
1773 Thomas Palmer
1774 Richard Windsor
1775 Nathaniel Newnham
1776 Robert Lathropp
1777 Nathaniel Hillier
1778 Charles Newsham Pigott
1779 Benjamin Porter
1780 Philip Chauncey
1781 Samuel Totton
1782 Gurdelston Rolfe
1783 Peregrine Cust
1784 Stevens Totton
1785 Edward Forster
1786 Thomas Furley Forster
1787 Joseph Crick (Obit.), William Clarke
1788 Roby Bishop
1789 Joseph Waugh
1790 William George Sibley
1791 George Sibley
1792 William Holmes
1793 John Watney (1747-1814)
1794 Thomas Palmer
1795 William Palmer
1796 Nathaniel Hillier
1797 Thomas Newnham
1798 Robert Thatcher
1799 Edmund Green
1800 Robert Johnson
1801 Henry Westear
1802 William Edward Ward
1803 William Lane
1804 John Paterson
1805 Randolph Stracey
1806 Joseph Knight
1807 Charles Buxton
1808 Thomas Marsham
1809 Nathaniel Newnham (Obit.), Edward Forster
1810 Edward Forster
1811 William Clarke
1812 William Holmes
1813 Robert Markland Barnard
1814 Thomas Charles Waugh
1815 Archdale Palmer
1816 Daniel Watney (1771-1831)
1817 Robert Sutton
1818 Joseph Yellowley
1819 Stevens Dineley Totton

== George IV ==
1820 George Palmer
1821 James Park Holmes
1822 Baden Powell
1823 James Barnes
1824 Edmund Francis Green
1825 Nathaniel Newnham
1826 John Horsley Palmer (1779-1858)
1827 George Lewis Newnham Collingwood
1828 Thomas Osborne
1829 Charles Frederick Johnson

== William IV ==
1830 William Henry Holmes
1831 Thomas Watney (1785-1867)
1832 George Bicknell
1833 John Roberts Delafosse
1834 John Day
1835 Lestock Peach Wilson
1836 Adolphus Pugh Johnson

== Queen Victoria ==
1837 Robert Sutton
1838 Robert Bicknell
1839 Nathaniel Clark
1840 Octavius Errington Johnson
1841 Joseph Thomas Pooley
1842 Robert Sutton
1843 Daniel Watney (1799-1874)
1844 George Aston
1845 George Palmer
1846 James Watney (1800-1884)
1847 James Sutton
1848 Michael Lock (Obit.), George Palmer
1849 William Palmer
1850 Hulbert Wathen
1851 William Barnes
1852 John Watney (1804-1875)
1853 Charles Powell
1854 Charles Frederick Johnson
1855 Thomas Lane
1856 Thomas Barker
1857 Edward Howley Palmer (1811-1901)
1858 Wadham Locke Sutton
1859 William Henry Harton
1860 William Farington
1861 Charlton Lane
1862 Markland Barnard
1863 John Shuttleworth Shuttleworth
1864 Joseph Williams Blakesley
1865 George Palmer
1866 John Williams Watson
1867 Thomas John Watney (1821-1906)
1868 Richard Whiteman Fall
1869 James Parke Holmes
1870 John Carrington Palmer (1815-1874)
1871 Daniel Watney (1824-1893)
1872 Morell Dorrington Longden
1873 John Watney (1828-1904)
1874 Markland Barnard
1875 Roundell Palmer, 1st Earl of Selborne
1876 Philip Blundell Bicknell
1877 George Fenn Aston
1878 Frederick Palmer
1879 James Watney MP (1832-1886)
1880 Norman Watney JP DL (1834-1911)
1881 George Palmer
1882 Charles Powell
1883 Archdale Villiers Palmer
1884 William Wallis Aston
1885 Daniel Watney (1835-1923)
1886 Percy Lee Holmes
1887 Herbert Clementi Smith
1888 Edward Howley Palmer
1889 Charlton George Lane
1890 Rev. James Watney MA (1836-1891) (Obit.), Edward Howley Palmer
1891 Ralph Charlton Palmer
1892 Montague Clementi
1893 Charles Thomas Lane
1894 James Baden Powell
1895 Meyrick John Sutton
1896 Thomas John Watney (2nd term) (1821-1906)
1897 Cecil Clementi Smith (1840-1916)
1898 Greville Horsley Palmer
1899 William Ward Lane-Claypon (1845–1939)
1900 George Holmes Blakesley

== Edward VII ==
1901 John Horsley Palmer
1902 Thomas Holmes Blakesley
1903 John Williams Watson
1904 Percival Clementi Smith
1905 Frederick Graham Thompson
1906 Charles Watson Powell
1907 John Holmes Blakesley
1908 Robert Henry Bicknell
1909 Walter Scarborough

== George V ==
1910 William Palmer, 2nd Earl of Selborne (1st term)
1911 Horace Cullen
1912 Edmund Stuart Palmer
1913 Robert Stephenson Smyth Baden-Powell
1914 Ralph Charlton Palmer
1915 Herbert Watney (1843-1932)
1916 Lawrence Peel Yates
1917 Baden Fletcher Smyth Baden-Powell
1918 Archdale Palmer
1919 Thomas Savile Watney (1867-1951)
1920 Stephen Cecil Watney (b. 1868)
1921 Charles Tillotson Watney (1869-1945)
1922 Charles Norman Watney (1868-1956)
1923 Frederick Paget Lane
1924 John Hunt Clayton
1925 William Byam Lane
1926 Arthur Edward Rayden
1927 Arthur Norman Watney (1871-1945)
1928 Edmund Holmes Blakesley
1929 Gerard Norman Watney (1872-1966)
1930 Robert Charlton Lane
1931 Reginald Stuart Palmer
1932 Vincent Sutherland Hodson
1933 Gerard Anstruther Wathen and William Palmer, 2nd Earl of Selborne (2nd term)
1934 William Arthur Powlett Lane
1935 Bertram Walter Archibald Watney (b. 1877)

== Edward VIII ==
1936 Frederick Blunt Wathen

== George VI ==
1937 Joseph Charlton Lane-Claypon
1938 Hubert Clementi Smith
1939 Hubert Clementi Smith
1940 Cecil Clementi (1875-1947)
1941 Herbert Andrew Watney (1882-1971)
1942 Eustace Clementi Smith
1943 Walter Howard Scarborough
1944 Herbert Drayton Clementi Smith
1945 Dr. Martyn Herbert Watney (1887-1972)
1946 Harold Godfrey Palmer
1947 Humphrey Charles Gilbert Watney (1881-1973)
1948 Roundell Palmer, 3rd Earl of Selborne
1949 Frederick Percy Harton
1950 William Jocelyn Lewis Palmer (1st term) (1894-1971)
1951 Humphrey Kenrick Totton

== Elizabeth II ==
1952 Lionel Grahame Rayden
1953 Cecil Curtis Harold Smith
1954 Charlton Adelbert Gustavus Lane
1955 Edgar William Edmond Lane
1956 William Jocelyn Lewis Palmer (1894-1971) (2nd term)
1957 Norman Charles Watney (1901-1998)
1958 John Lewis Watney
1959 Archibald Sands Clayton
1960 Dennis Montagu Clementi
1961 Peter Winckworth
1962 Mark William Gerard Wathen (1912-2011)
1963 Rowland Roberts Blades, 2nd Baron Ebbisham
1964 Henry Vincent Hodson (1906-1999)
1965 Robert Jocelyn Palmer (1919-1991)
1966 John Douglas Watney (1916-1983)
1967 Francis Herbert Tate
1968 George Cummings Walton
1969 John Philip Carrington Palmer (1916-2006)
1970 Geoffrey Acworth Rimbault (1908-1991)
1971 Henry Redvers Greville Howard
1972 Struan Manwaring Robertson
1973 John Grahame Barker
1974 Charles Roger Tyssen Lane
1975 Martin Arthur O’brien Ffrench Blake
1976 Sir James Walter Scott, 2nd Baronet
1977 Cresswell Clementi (1918-1981)
1978 Derrick Ide-Smith (1920-2008)
1979 Robert Brook Bridges
1980 Martin Arthur O’brien Ffrench Blake
1981 David Neville Vermont
1982 Stuart Kaye Machattie Powell
1983 Alexander Michael Graham
1984 Julian Philip Gerard Wathen
1985 Christopher Sands Clayton (b. 1938) (1st term)
1986 Sir Michael James Harwood Harrison, 2nd Baronet (1936-2019)
1987 David Charles Watney (b. 1932)
1988 Bernard Martyn Watney (1922-1998)
1989 John Palmer, 4th Earl of Selborne (b. 1940)
1990 John Adrian Watney (b. 1943)
1991 John James Fenwick (b. 1932)
1992 Henry William Palmer (1941-2010)
1993 Francis Robert Baden-Powell
1994 Duncan Martyn Watney (b. 1931)
1995 William Oliver Clarke (b. 1943)
1996 John Drayton Hedges (b. 1943)
1997 David Anthony Tate (b. 1941)
1998 Richard Kelso Westmacott (b. 1934)
1999 Philip Richard Withers Green (b. 1942)
2000 Richard Cawton Cunis (b. 1943)
2001 Anthony Edward Hodson (b. 1937)
2002 Michael Greville Dudgeon (b. 1943)
2003 John Christopher Calthorpe Blofeld (b. 1932)
2004 Charles Clive Scott (b. 1954)
2005 Anthony Roderick Charlton Lane (b. 1939)
2006 Christopher Sands Clayton (b. 1938) (2nd term)
2007 Frederick Christopher Gerald Hohler (b. 1943)
2008 Daniel Houghton Hodson (b. 1944)
2009 Frederick W. Scarborough
2010 Sir David Clementi
2011 Thomas Clifford Sheldon
2012 Timothy John Palmer
2013 Simon Walter Julian Wathen
2014 Miss Deborah Clare Ounsted
2015 Timothy Christopher Ashley Haywood
2016 John Manwaring Robertson
2017 John Roderick Graham
2018 Xenia Violet Dennen
2019 Mark Christopher Leonard Aspinall

== See also ==
- List of lord mayors of London
- Livery company – Trade association in the City of London
