= William S. Rainsford =

William S Rainsford
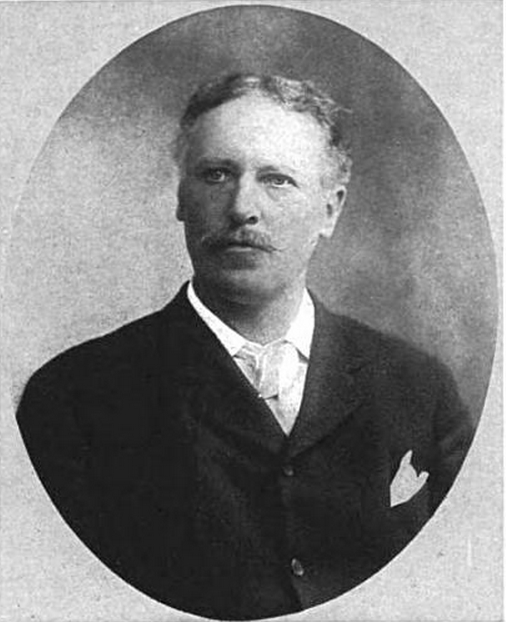
- Rainsford in 1898
- Born: October 30, 1850; Dublin, Ireland
- Died: December 17, 1933 (aged 83); New York City
- Resting place: Manhattan
- Education: Cambridge University
- Occupations: Rector, author
- Known for: Rector of St. George's Church

William Stephen Rainsford (October 30, 1850 − December 17, 1933) was the rector of St. George's Church in Stuyvesant Square in New York from 1883 to 1906.

== Early life ==
He was born in Dublin to Marcus Rainsford, who was a chaplain in a hospital for the blind. The family moved to Dundalk between 1852 and 1865, when his father was appointed vicar of Dundalk by the Earl of Roden, a leading figure in the Protestant Second Reformation, and then London when he became incumbent of St. John's Chapel, Belgrave Square. Rainsford attended Cambridge University from 1870 to 1873, and spent time in the south of France, suspending his studies for health reasons.

== Career ==
When he left France, with Herbert Watney, and after experience in mission work in the East End of London, he led a group of 800 people emigrating from the London slums to western Canada. He became a curate at the Parish of St. Giles in Norwich in England, and after four years accepted an offer to preach in New York for four months. In 1878, he took a position at St. James's Cathedral in Toronto.

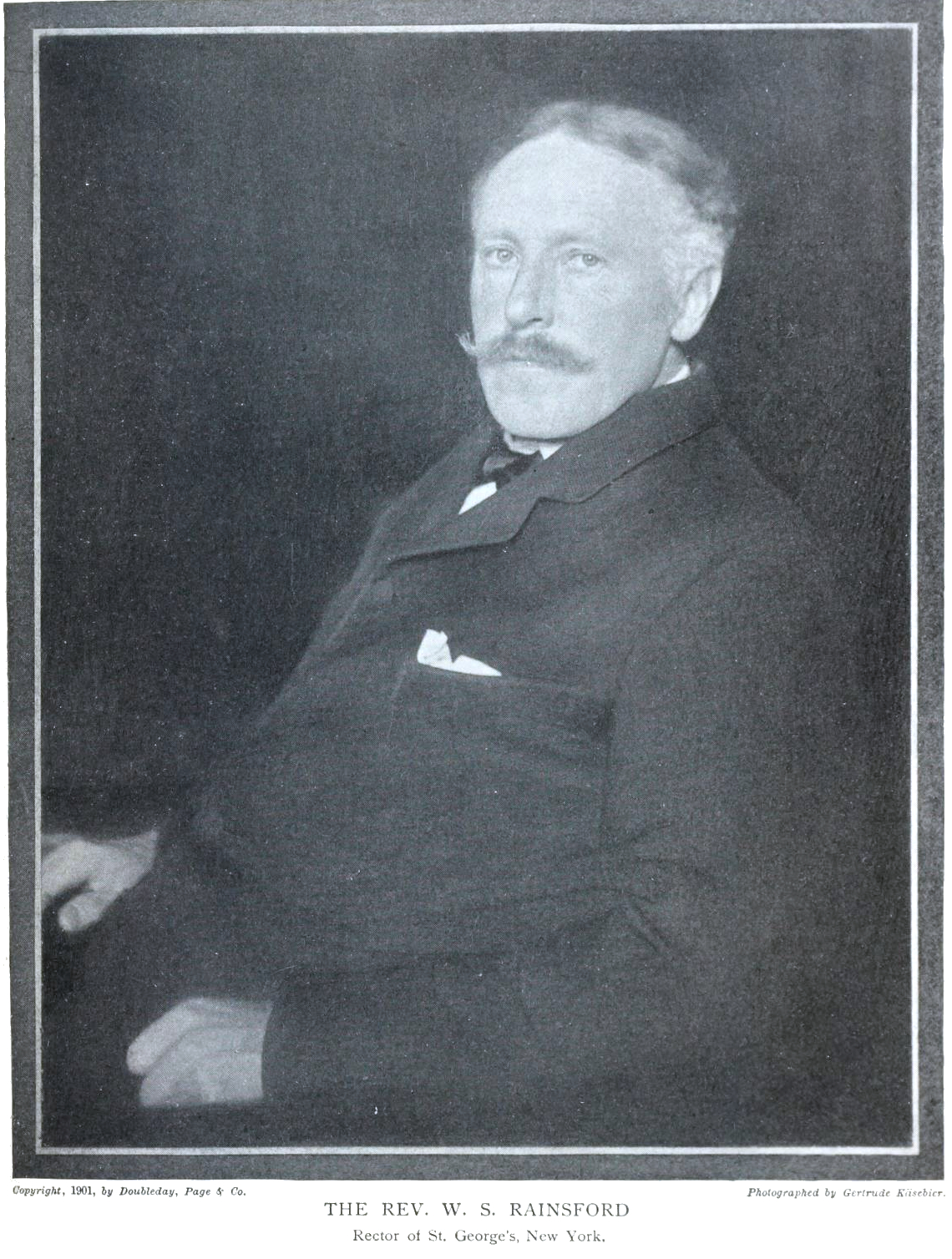
c. 1900

In May 1882, the vestry of St. George's Church, which included J. Pierpont Morgan, offered the post of rector to Rainsford; several members of the vestry had heard Rainsford preach when he was in New York. The church was under some stress, because of changes in the local population and a substantial debt of $35,000. After some negotiations he accepted. Rainsford is reported to have said that after a month of his sermons seven of the fourteen families still attending the church had left, but after that point the church's membership grew.

== Personal life ==
Rainsford married Emily Alma Green in London in 1878, and they had three sons: Lawrence, Ralph Stewart, and Kerr. His wife died in 1923, and he remarried, to Harriette Rogers (1870–1963), daughter of William Evans Rogers and Susan LeRoy Fish.

He died at Roosevelt Hospital in New York on December 17, 1933.

== Published works ==
He published several books, including:

- Sermons Preached In St. George's (1887). New York: Dodd, Mead & Company
- Good Friday Meditation (1901). New York: E.P. Dutton & Company
- Reasonableness of Faith, and Other Addresses (1902). New York: Doubleday, Page & Company
- A Preacher's Story of His Work (1903). Cambridge, Massachusetts: The Outlook Company
- The Land of the Lion (1909). New York: Doubleday, Page & Company
- The Reasonableness of the Religion of Jesus (1913). Boston: Houghton Mifflin Company
- The Story of a Varied Life: An Autobiography (1922). New York: Doubleday, Page & Company
