= Ada Annie Watney =

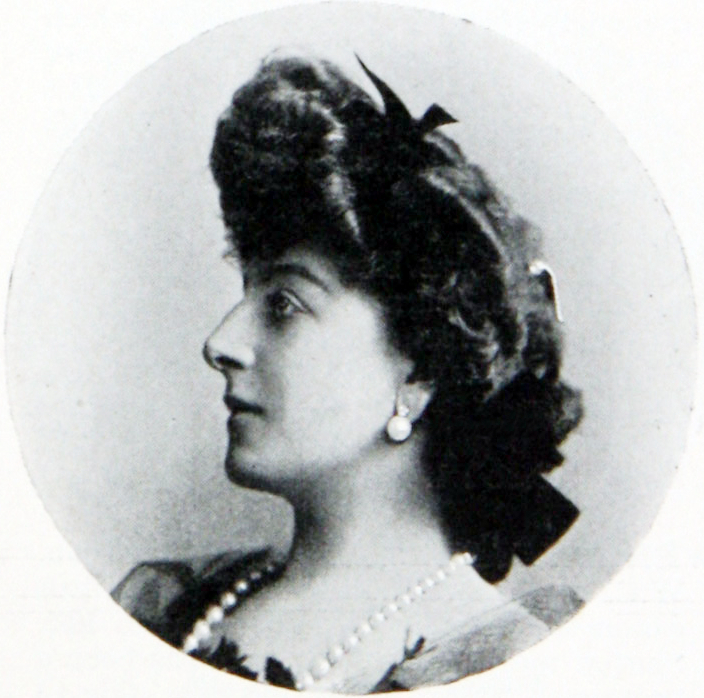
Ada Watney, c. 1900

Ada Annie Watney (née Nunn, later Weguelin) (1868–1938) was a founding member and committee member in the Ladies' Automobile Club (as Mrs Bernard Weguelin). It was reported in 1904 that she had driven nearly 60,000 miles in six years.

== Early life ==
Ada Nunn was born in 1868 to an English father and a Portuguese mother.

== Marriages ==
On 15 August 1889 at St Luke's Church, London, Ada Annie Nunn aged 21, "reputed to be a former ballet-dancer" had married 19-year-old Sherman Martin, the eldest son of the banker and socialite Bradley Martin, but when his parents found out some weeks later, they were "overwhelmed with mortification", and Ada was offered $10,000 to divorce. Martin was eventually welcomed home, went on a world tour, and his sister Cornelia Martin married William Craven, 4th Earl of Craven. Martin relapsed and was sent to the Hartford Retreat for the Insane in March 1894, and after a few months was released apparently cured of his dipsomania, but died on 22 December 1894 in Baltimore after a very brief illness.

In 1895 she married Claude Watney, a fellow motor enthusiast and director of the Watney, Combe & Reid brewing firm. In the late 1890s they moved to 20 Charles Street, Mayfair, London, which became the family home. During the First World War, Ada turned part of the house into a nursing home for officers "furnished and equipped with every requirement of modern surgery, and fully staffed by trained sisters and nurses".

The Watneys also owned High Elms Manor, later Garston Manor, in Garston, Hertfordshire, which was placed for sale in 1911, and Mervil Hill, a house in Hambledon, Surrey. The latter was also used as a convalescent home for soldiers during the First World War, and in 1929 it was transferred by Ada, then a widow, to the Sisters of the Sacred Hearts of Jesus and Mary, who turned it into St Dominic's School, a "residential school for delicate boys".

Claude Watney died in 1919 leaving an estate worth £573,088. Ada subsequently married the motorist Bernard Weguelin.

== Death ==
Ada Annie Weguelin died in 1938.
