= Combe Delafield and Co. =

English brewer

Combe Delafield and Co. was among the major brewers in London during the nineteenth century, before being acquired by Watney in 1898, thus forming Watney Combe & Reid.

The Woodyard Brewery, of Castle Street, Long Acre, situated midway between the City and the West End of London, is supposed to have taken its name from a timber yard or cooperage on its original site. The first name definitely associated with the brewery is John Shackly, described at his death in 1739 as 'an eminent and wealthy brewer'. Shackly was then in partnership with William Gyfford, who maintained and extended the brewery business until his death in 1762. His son Anthony then succeeded him in partnership with William Jarman, a distiller, and others. At this time the brewery was known as Gyfford and Co. In 1787 a new partner took the business over. This was Harvey Christian Combe, whose mother was a Jarman. Combe, who had been apprenticed to a London corn and malt factor, married his daughter and taken on his business, was remarkable for his energy and great business ability. Combe, a Whig politician, had been Lord Mayor of London in 1799-1800 and was a Member of Parliament for the City of London from 1796 to 1817.

The business was largely increased under the management of Combe, who repaired and rebuilt the brewery premises. On his death in 1818 the brewery passed to his son, Harvey Combe, and his brother-in-law, Joseph Delafield, by whom the premises were further enlarged. Harvey Combe, who was a great sportsman and well known as the master of the Berkeley Hounds, died unmarried in 1858. He was succeeded by his two nephews, Messrs. R. H. and Charles Combe, Mr. Joseph Bonsor and his two sons, and Mr. John Spicer. Under the management of these partners, the brewhouse property was still further extended, and ultimately covered more than 4 acres (16,000 m^{2}). The water, or "liquor" as the brewers term it, required for brewing purposes was supplied in part by the New River Company and partly by three deep wells sunk by the firm upon the premises.

In 1834, the company was involved in two major strikes. The first, in March, involved the coopers who were demanding an increase in their wages; part of their tactics involved persuading other workers to boycott the company's beer. Although this strike petered out, it set a precedent. In April, the following single line article appeared in The Times: "The carpenters and bricklayers belonging to the Trades Unions have, in consequence of Messrs. Combe and Delafield's refusal to employ any person connected with Trade Unions, resolved to drink no more of their beer" (The Times, 5 Apr 1834).

In July, the Master Builders proposed the reduction in the wages paid to the journeymen and to refuse to employ members of the Operative Builders' Union. Amongst the Master Builders concerned were Lewis and William Cubitt, brothers of Thomas Cubitt, who had workshops on the Gray's Inn Road. The brothers had had long-standing connections with the brewery, being responsible for the construction of a number of its pubs. In return for these profitable contracts, the brothers prohibited the consumption of any beer in their workshops, other than that brewed by Combe Delafield. The unions called for a boycott of the brewery culminating on 26 July 1834 in a meeting at the Silver Cup public house, when an extraordinary resolution was passed, "that all workers in the metropolis are urged to stop drinking beer produced by the Combe and Delafield brewery". The dispute continued until November, with neither side achieving much. The biggest losers were possibly Combe Delafield who, despite being innocent victims of the dispute, suffered heavy losses through reduced beer sales.

Originally, the brewery's main product had been the dark porter style of beer. In 1818 it was the fifth largest brewer of Porter in London, producing over 130,000 barrels (21,000 m^{3}) a year. By the middle of the 19th century, following the Great Exhibition lighter ales were becoming more popular. According to "The Red Barrel: a History of Watney Mann", by Hurford Janes (1963) "at the Wood Yard Brewery Combe, Delafield & Co, quickly adjusted their methods to meet the new demand, brewing ales similar in colour and flavour to those of Burton ale which had become the rage".

In 1866, the company changed its name to Combe & Co. By the late 19th century, the senior partner in the brewery was Joseph Bonsor's son, Sir Cosmo Bonsor, who organised an amalgamation of Combe & Co. and Reid and Co. with the Watney brewery, to form Watney Combe & Reid, of which he remained chairman until 1928.
