= The Car Illustrated =

British automobile magazine

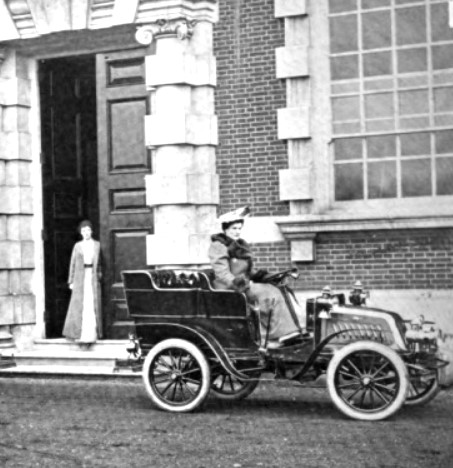
Lady Mary Isabel Portman riding a Clément car in The Car Illustrated. A Journal of Travel by Land, Sea, and Air, January 1903

The Car Illustrated. A Journal of Travel by Land, Sea, and Air was a British weekly automobile magazine, first published on 28 May 1902.

It was edited by Hon. John Scott Montagu MP, the son of Henry Douglas-Scott-Montagu, 1st Baron Montagu of Beaulieu, and an early motoring enthusiast. On his father's death in November 1905, he succeeded to the title as John Douglas-Scott-Montagu, 2nd Baron Montagu of Beaulieu In 1899, Scott became the first person to drive a car into the yard of the House of Commons, a 12 hp Daimler that he had recently bought, and in September 1899, his Daimler finished third in the touring car class in the Paris–Ostend race, the first prize ever won by a British driver in a British-built car.
