= Leonard Sharland =

British missionary

Leonard Sharland standing beside his car while 'on trek' in Sudan

Leonard William Chapple Sharland LTh MA (1904–1978) was a pioneer missionary amongst the Dinka people with the Gordon Memorial Mission of the Church Missionary Society (CMS) in southern Sudan in the middle of the 20th century.

== Early life ==
Leonard Sharland was born on 30 August 1904 in Well Street, Exeter and moved with the family at and early age to Camperdown Terrace, Exmouth, Devon. He was from a Devonian family which for many generations had lived in Morchard Bishop. His parents William and Ethel Sharland moved from Exeter to Exmouth not long after Leonard was born. The family then moved to a terraced house in Clifford Road, Wallasey, Cheshire, in 1911. Leonard left school at 14 years old during the 1st World War to work as an office boy for an estate agent.

Despite leaving school so young, Leonard studied in the evenings and was admitted to St Aidan's Theological College, Birkenhead, where he obtained a Licentiate of Theology in 1929. He then went on to complete a master's degree at St John's College, Durham. He was the first member of the family to go on to further education.

== Ordination and Curacies ==
Leonard was ordained a deacon 1930, and ordained Priest in 1931 in Chester. He was curate of Christ Church Macclesfield from 1930. During this time he was very active in work with youth, and followed his calling to become a missionary.

== A Missionary in Sudan ==
In 1931 Leonard's brother, Charles Sharland, who was a cabinet maker, went out to southern Sudan to Loka and to start a trade school in Lainya, west of Juba. Two years later Leonard followed him.

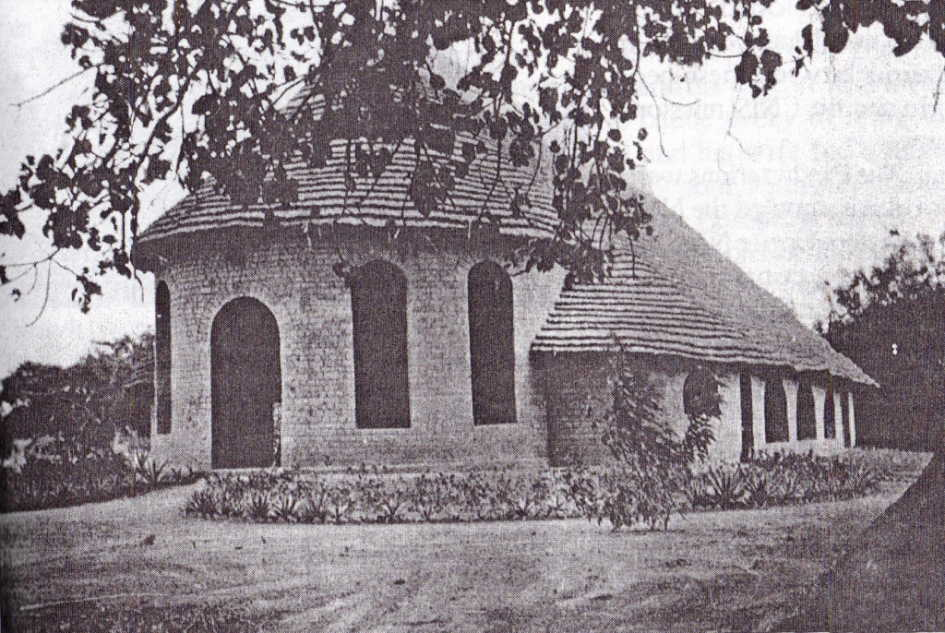
The church at the CMS mission station in Akot, now destroyed

Leonard joined the Gordon Memorial Sudan Mission of the Church Missionary Society (CMS) and left for Sudan in 1934. His first station was at Malek, on the banks of the River Nile where he served a sort of apprenticeship under the original pioneer missionary of the mission in Sudan, Archdeacon Shaw. He spent a time acting as headmaster in Nugent School Loka, but his main work was amongst the cattle keeping Dinka people. He worked at the mission stations at Akot, Gel River and Panekar, finally ending his time with the mission in Rumbek, where he saw the rapid changes as Sudan gained independence. As an ordained minister he had a central pastoral ministry, but was also very involved in education, and a certain amount of building. He was described as "one of these rare men who can be appointed to educational, eveangelistic or pioneer missionary work and generally combines the three together". He was made a Canon of Khartoum Cathedral in 1951. Leonard returned from leave in England in 1951 with a wife and when he left in 1958 had three sons.

From 1946-1955 Leonard was the field editor of the ‘Southern Sudan Mailbag’ which brought news, mostly in the form of letters, from members of the Gordon Memorial Sudan Mission.

== A Clergyman in England ==
After returning to England from Sudan in 1958, Leonard spent a year in Limpsfield, Surrey working on manuscript of the Bible translated into the Dinka language. At the end of 1959 he took up the post of Vicar at St Faith's, Maidstone, a busy town centre church. After ten years there he moved to a country parish as Rector of St Mary's, Hardington Mandeville, near Yeovil, Somerset.

When he retired in 1976 Leonard returned with his family to his roots in Devon to Lympstone, just outside Exmouth where he was born. He died on 5 Feb 1978 at a mission conference at Lee Abbey, Lynton, North Devon.

== Family ==
Leonard Sharland married Faith Streatfeild (1915–2002) in 1951 in her home town of Westerham Kent. She was also a missionary with the same mission in Sudan and came from an old Kentish family. Two of her aunts had also been missionaries in Uganda and China.

Leonard and Faith had four sons, Peter (born 1952), Roger (born 1953), Andrew (born 1956) and David (born 1959). Two of the sons, Roger and David, and his grandson Emmanuel have been missionaries in Sudan.

His eldest son Colonel Peter Roland Sharland, late of The Light Infantry, was awarded the Commander of the Order of the British Empire (CBE) in The New Year Honours 2006.

== Ancestry ==
Ancestors of Leonard Sharland

16. Roger Sharland
8. John Sharland
17. Agnes
4. Thomas Sharland
18. Thomas Norman
9. Mary Norman
19. Mary
2. William Thomas Chapple Sharland
20. Thomas Chapple
10. William Chapple
21. Mary
5. Mary Chapple
22. William Tucker
11. Ann
23. Mary Lock
1. Rev Leonard William Chapple Sharland
24. William Smith
12. James Smith
25. Eleanor
6. James Smith
13. Ann Waddell
3. Ethel Marian Smith
28. Philip Upcott
14. Charles Thomas Upcott
29. Frances Morgan
7. Ann Upcott
30. George Hodges
15. Ann Hodges
31. Sarah Handford
