= Watney Combe & Reid =

London brewery business

- Industry: Brewing
- Predecessor: The Stag Brewery
- Founded: 1837
- Defunct: 1979
- Fate: Acquired
- Successor: Watney Mann
- Headquarters: London, United Kingdom
- Products: Beer

Watney Combe & Reid was a leading brewery in London. At its peak in the 1930s it was a constituent of the FT 30 index of leading companies on the London Stock Exchange. It produced Watney's Red Barrel.

== History ==
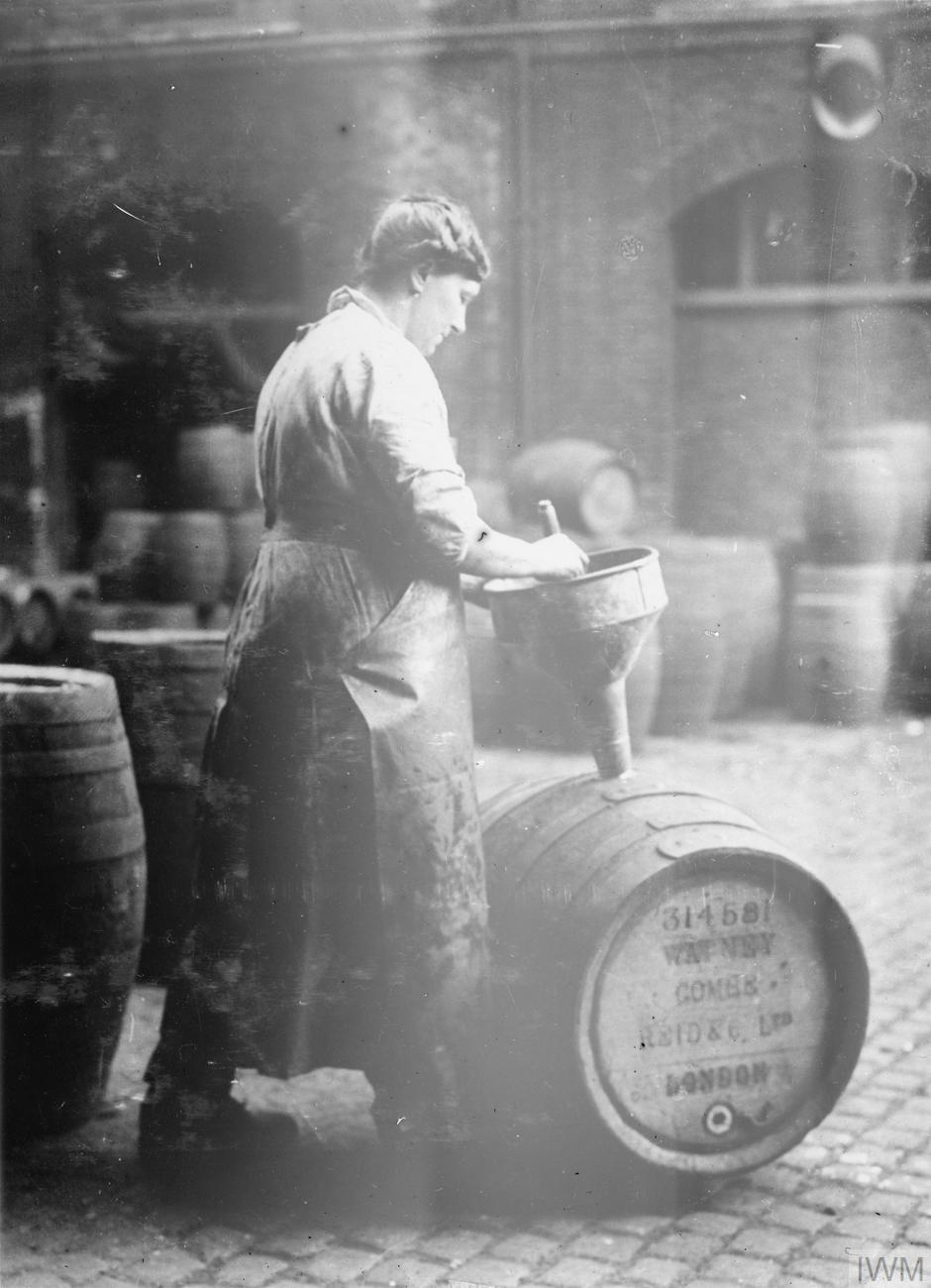
A brewer adding hops to a cask during World War I

Watney's Red Barrel logo

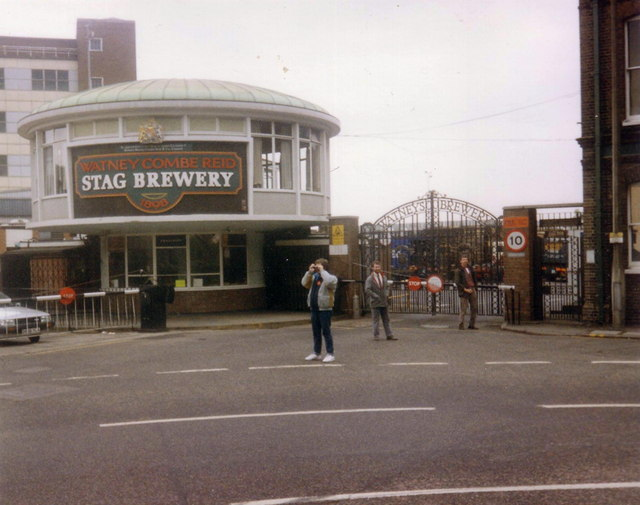
The Stag Brewery, Mortlake in 1989

The Watney family were the main partners in the Stag Brewery, Victoria, for much of the 19th century. In 1837 James Watney became a partner in the brewery, followed by his sons James and Norman in 1856. On his death in 1884, the brewery became a private limited company.

In 1889 James Watney & Co., acquired the Mortlake Brewery (latterly referred to as the Stag Brewery of Mortlake), which had been owned by Charles James Philips and James Wigan since the 1840s.

In 1898 the company merged with Combe Delafield and Co. and Reid and Co., and was subsequently known as Watney Combe and Reid. The amalgamated company was the largest brewer in London. The Combe brewery in Longacre and the Reid brewery in Clerkenwell closed almost immediately, and production was concentrated on the Watney Stag Brewery in Pimlico. The company had an annual output of 1.8 million hl (1.5 million US bbl; 40 million imp gal).

Watney Mann was formed in 1958 with the merger of Watney, Combe, Reid & Co. Ltd with Mann, Crossman & Paulin Ltd.

When the Stag Brewery in Victoria was demolished in 1959 the name was transferred to Mortlake Brewery.

The business acquired other brewers, including Wilsons of Manchester, Phipps NBC of Northampton, Samuel Webster & Sons of Halifax and Ushers of Trowbridge, before being taken over by Grand Metropolitan, a hotels and catering group, in 1972 and closed in 1979.

== Watney's Red Barrel ==
Watney's Red Barrel was a bitter which sold highly in the United Kingdom during the 1960s and 1970s. It was introduced in 1931 as an export keg beer that could travel for long distances by being made stable through filtering and pasteurising, as such it was the first keg beer. It was reformulated and relaunched as "Watney's Red" in 1971.

A 3.9% abv pale lager called Watney's Red Barrel was sold by Sleeman Breweries until 1997 and a 6.0% beer with the same name is still brewed by Alken-Maes.

In 1964, Watney's Red Barrel was served at the British Pavilion at the World's Fair in New York. The exhibit featured a Pub called "the British Lion". Following its exhibit, Watney's Red Barrel was available in the United States in bottle and draft form. Red Barrel was considered as a premium ale and was priced the same as Fuller's London Pride and Charles Wells's Bombardier Ale, both of which are still being produced.

Watney's Red Barrel was referenced five times in the Monty Python's Travel Agents Sketch which first aired on the BBC on 16 November 1972. The sketch featured Eric Idle, Michael Palin and Carol Cleveland. Eric Idle played a customer looking to book a holiday, Michael Palin the Travel Agent and Carol Cleveland the Receptionist.

== Advertising ==
For many years, Watney's advertised with the strapline "What we want is Watney's".

The company sponsored the Watney Cup association football tournament from 1970 to 1973.
