= Marlowe House =

Police building in Sidcup, London

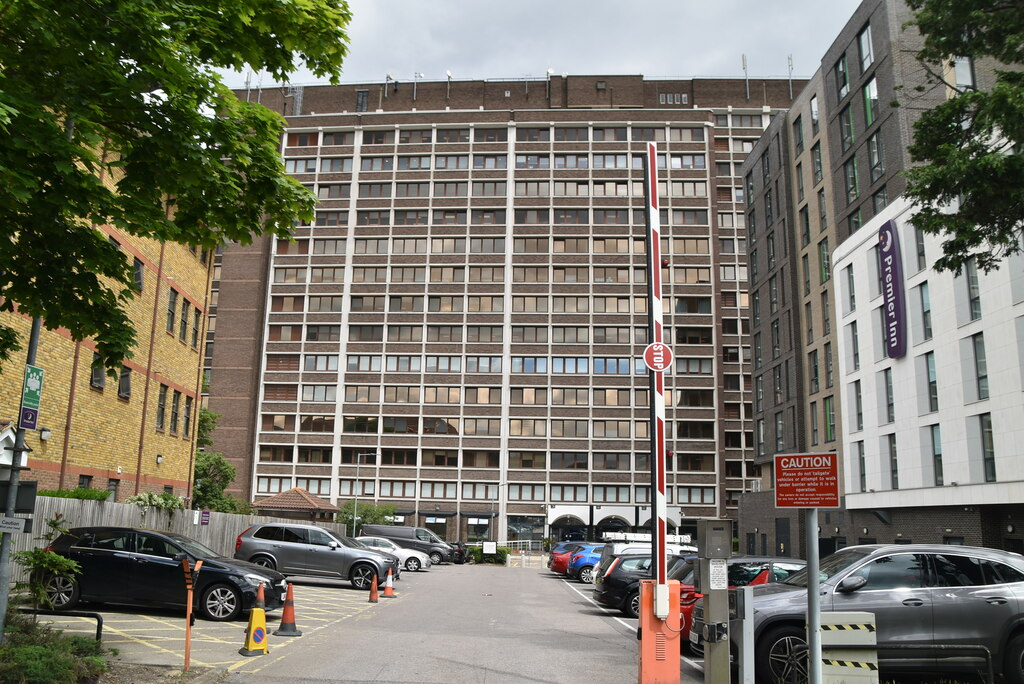
- Marlowe House (centre) in 2022
- Interactive map of the Marlowe House area

General information
- Location: Sidcup, London, England
- Coordinates: 51.4337°N 0.1019°E
- Topped-out: 22 June 1966
- Owner: Metropolitan Police

Marlowe House is a Metropolitan Police building in Sidcup in the London Borough of Bexley. It houses administrative offices and training facilities, and is home to the Metropolitan Police Museum and the Metropolitan Police Historic Vehicle Collection.

== History ==
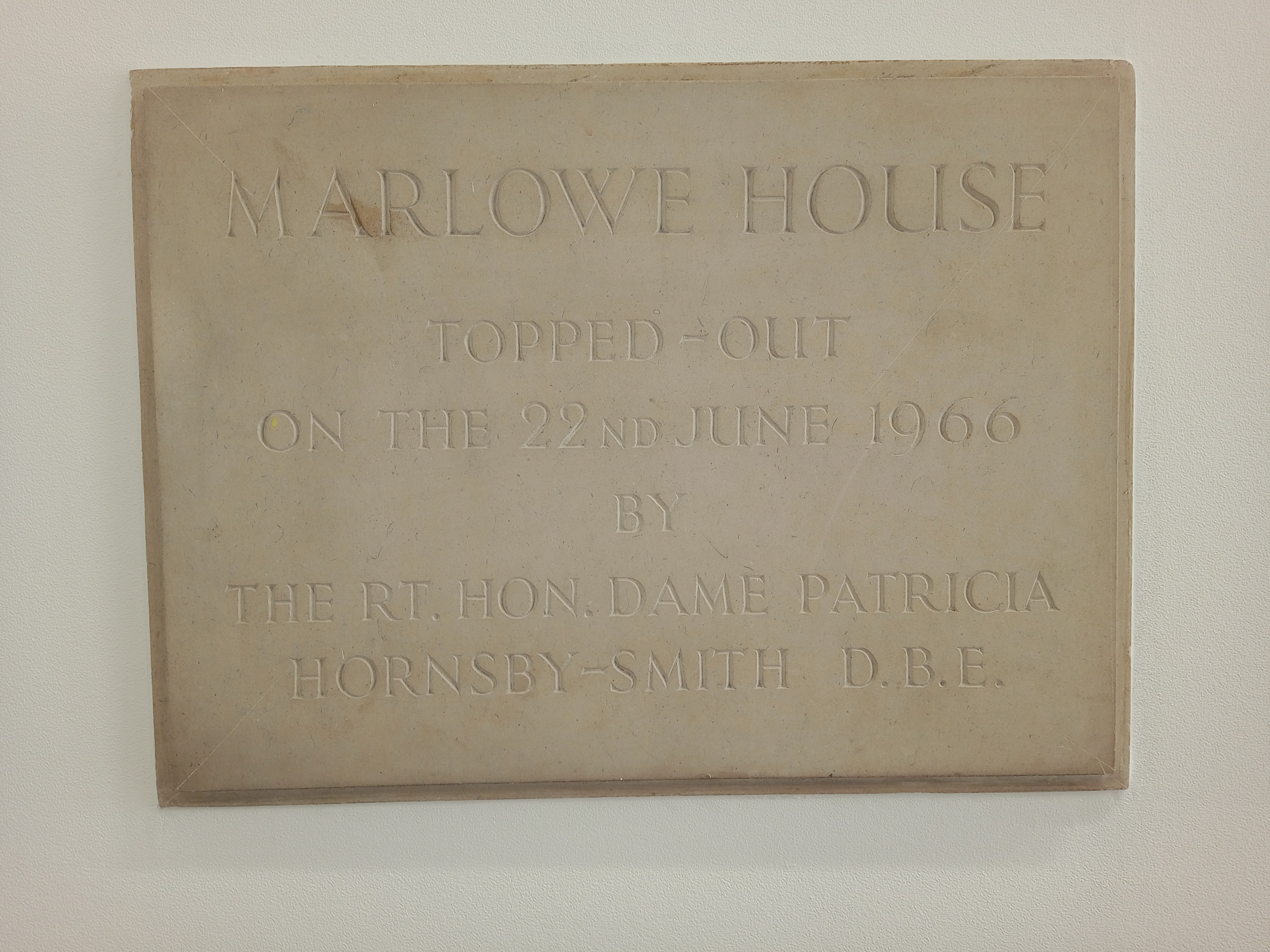
Plaque in the foyer of Marlowe House marking its topping out on 22 June 1966 by Patricia Hornsby-Smith, the local Member of Parliament for Chislehurst, in which Sidcup then fell.

The 17-storey building was completed in 1966 and is the tallest building in the borough.

The building was purchased by the Metropolitan Police in 2005 at a cost of £34.6 million. At the time the Met occupied around 45% of the building, with the rest leased to other tenants.

Since 19 March 2012 its ground floor has also housed Sidcup's police station. A refurbishment was completed in 2020.

The Metropolitan Police Museum, previously located in an annexe of the Empress State Building in West Brompton, relocated to Marlowe House in October 2022.
