= Metropolitan Police Museum =

Law enforcement museum in London, England

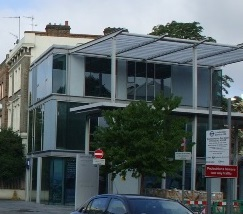
- The Centre's 2009-2020 home in the annexe to Empress State Building.

- Location within Greater London
- Established: 1949
- Location: Marlowe House, Sidcup, London, England
- Coordinates: 51.4336°N 0.1019°E
- Public transit access: Sidcup
- Website: www.met.police.uk/police-forces/metropolitan-police/areas/about-us/about-the-met/met-museums-archives/

The Metropolitan Police Museum is the museum, library and archive of the Metropolitan Police Service (MPS), conserving and curating documents, books, objects and uniforms relating to the organisation's history. (Note: Most of the Metropolitan Police's centrally-produced official records from 1829 to 2012 are instead at The National Archives under the reference MEPO, with some also filed under HO - this is because until the creation of MOPAC in 2012 the Metropolitan Police fell under the Home Office and therefore its records were included in the Public Records Act 1958.) Over the course of its existence it has also been known as the Police Museum, Bow Street Museum, the Metropolitan Police Historical Collection and from 2009 to 2022 as the Metropolitan Police Heritage Centre. It and the Crime Museum are both run by a team within Operational Support Services, itself part of MO11. It also assists with the care of the Metropolitan Police Historic Vehicle Collection, since 2023 at the same site.

== History ==
The first appeal for objects was put out by Chief Superintendent Arthur Rowlerson of E Division in 1949 to mark the bicentenary of the Metropolitan Police's forerunners the Bow Street Runners. The resulting collection was housed at Bow Street Police Station, but a curator was not appointed until 1967, the year which also saw the foundation of both a Historical Society and a Museums Advisory Board. (Note: Initially solely covering the Police Museum, the Board's remit was later extended to the Crime Museum and other collections within the Met such as that of the Thames River Police at Wapping) The first curator Audrey Sams was an existing member of the Met's civil staff at Bow Street who had previously been a police officer. She organised loans to an exhibition at the Museum of London in 1979 to mark the Met's 150th anniversary and instigated research into a potential new site at an empty Met building in Wapping.

In September 1981 Sams was succeeded as curator by Marcelle Marceau. Later that year the exhibition space at Bow Street closed and the collections store moved to a former Met clothing store on the third floor of a former piano factory (now known as Piano House) on Brighton Terrace in Brixton, moving to another store in Charlton in 1993. No new display space was found until July 2009, when a new gallery space and research room opened in an annexe to Empress State Building, an MPS office building in west London, headed by curator Maggie Bird and renamed the Metropolitan Police Heritage Centre. With the planned change of use of Empress State Building to a counter-terrorism hub, the gallery space at West Brompton closed in early 2020. The collection then moved to Marlowe House in Sidcup, where a new research room opened in October 2022 and a new gallery in spring 2023.
