= Battarbee =

Battarbee is a surname. Notable people with the surname include:

- Christopher Battarbee, British palaeoecologist
- Rex Battarbee (1893–1973), Australian artist
- Keith Battarbee (born 1944) sociolinguist
- Richard Battarbee (born 1975), English cricketer
