= Sidcup =

Area of south east London, England

Coordinates: 51.4263°N 0.1024°E

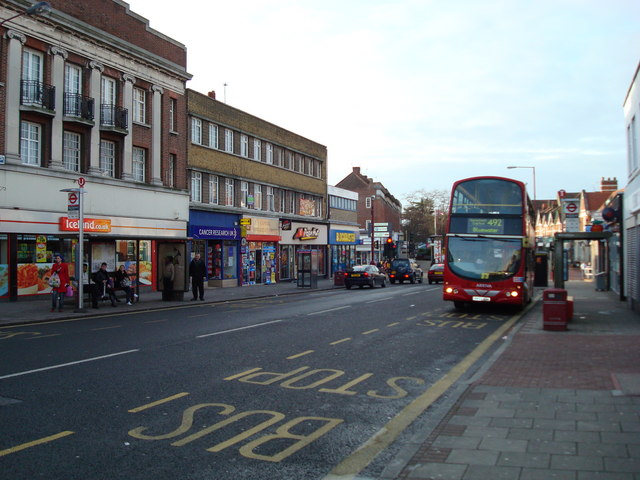
- Sidcup High Street

- Location within Greater London
- Population: 15,400
- OS grid reference: TQ461718
- London borough: Bexley
- Ceremonial county: Greater London
- Region: London
- Country: England
- Sovereign state: United Kingdom
- Post town: SIDCUP
- Postcode district: DA14, DA15
- Post town: LONDON
- Postcode district: SE9
- Dialling code: 020
- Police: Metropolitan
- Fire: London
- Ambulance: London
- UK Parliament: Old Bexley and Sidcup
- London Assembly: Bexley and Bromley

Sidcup is an area of south-east London, England, primarily in the London Borough of Bexley. It is 11.3 miles (18.2 km) south-east of Charing Cross, bordering the London Boroughs of Bromley and Greenwich. It was part of Kent prior to the creation of Greater London in 1965.

The name is thought to be derived from Cetecopp meaning "seat-shaped or flat-topped hill"; it had its earliest recorded use in 1254.

According to the ONS, as of 2021, the population of Sidcup is 15,400 (rounded to the nearest 100).

== History ==
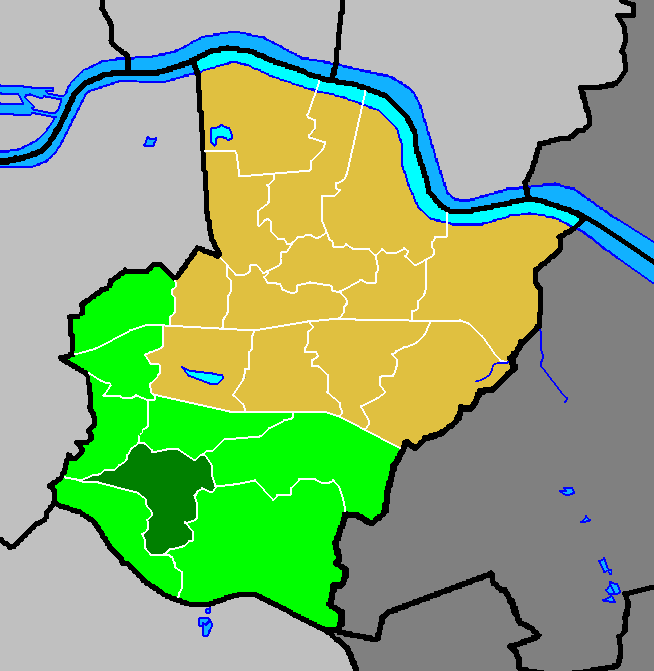
Sidcup ward (dark green) in the Old Bexley and Sidcup constituency (light green) within the London Borough of Bexley (yellow)

=== Origins ===
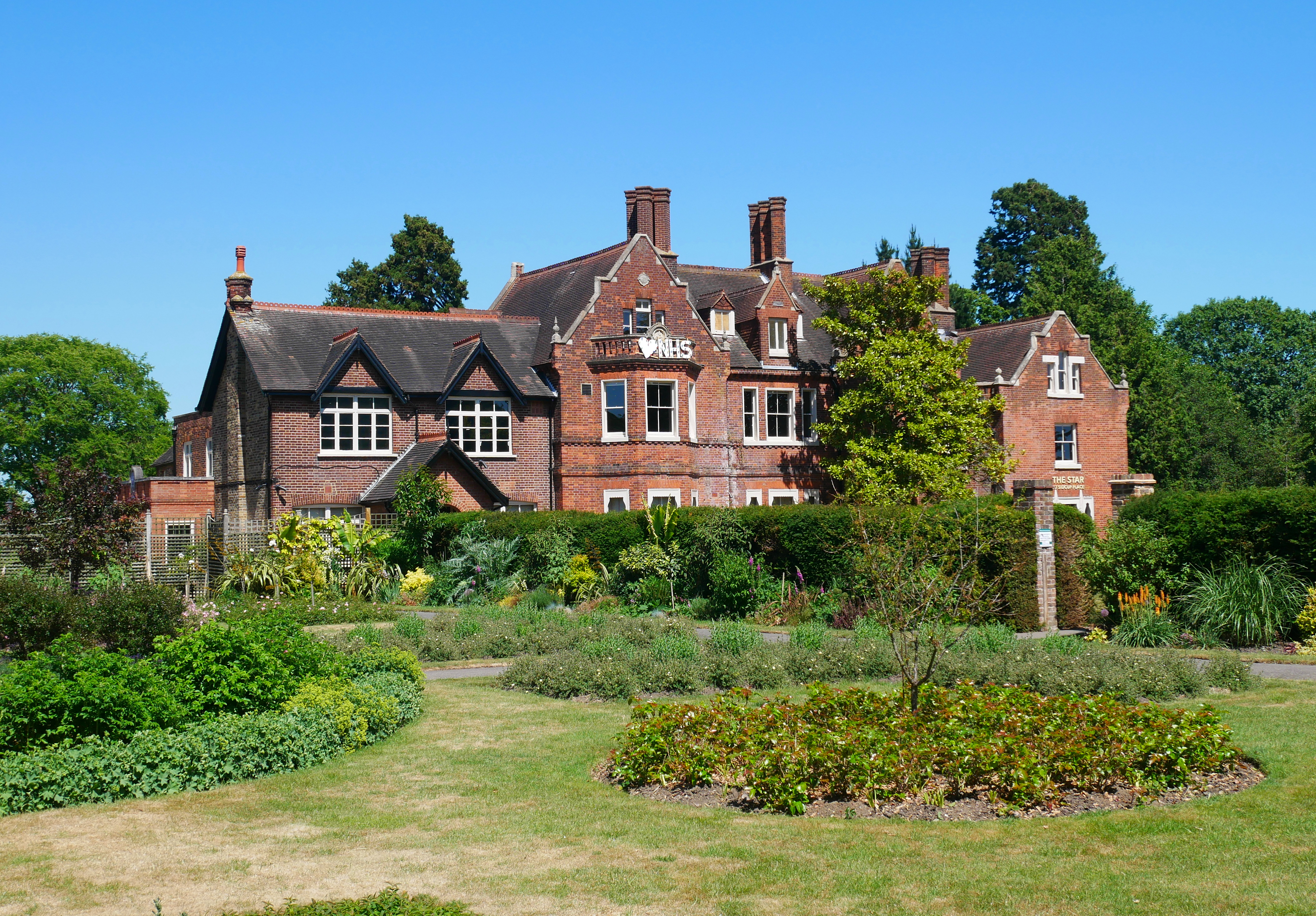
The 18th-century Sidcup Place

Sidcup originated as a tiny hamlet on the road from Maidstone to London. According to Edward Hasted, "Thomas de Sedcopp was owner of this estate in the 35th year of king Henry VI. [i.e. in the 1450s] as appears by his deed." Hasted described Sidcup in the latter part of the 18th century as "a small street of houses, among which is an inn of much resort", referring to the former Black Horse pub on the high street.

Sidcup parish formed the Sidcup Urban District of Kent from 1908. It was initially known as Foots Cray; however, in 1921 the urban district, and in 1925 the parish, were renamed Sidcup. On 1 April 1934 the parish and district were abolished and combined with Chislehurst to form the Chislehurst and Sidcup civil parish and urban district. In 1965 the parish and urban district were abolished. Sidcup went on to form part of the London Borough of Bexley in Greater London and Chislehurst formed part of the London Borough of Bromley. At the 1931 census (the last before the abolition of the parish), Sidcup had a population of 12,355.

=== Recent ===
A number of manor houses, converted to other uses, remain. They include Frognal House, the birthplace and residence of Thomas Townshend, 1st Viscount Sydney, converted for use as residential and nursing accommodation; Lamorbey House, now used by Rose Bruford College; Sidcup Place, a bar and restaurant; and The Hollies, converted for residential use.

== Area ==
Sidcup borders Blackfen to the north, Albany Park to the northeast and east, Foots Cray to the south-east, Chislehurst to the south and south-west, New Eltham to the west and Avery Hill to the north-west.

Sidcup has a mixture of large Victorian and Edwardian properties alongside typical 1930s suburbia. It retains many parks and open spaces hinting at the great estates and large homes which once stood in the area.

The town contains Queen Mary's Hospital, a large Leisure Centre, four colleges and three secondary schools. Sidcup High Street is the main retail and commercial street, and there are some other shops and local businesses on the adjacent Station Road. In 2014, Sidcup High Street was the subject of a £1.8 million regeneration scheme In Store For Sidcup paid for by London Borough of Bexley.

Most of the district is within the London Borough of Bexley, however, several parts in the North are under the governance of the Royal Borough of Greenwich, including Southspring, Greenhithe Close, Halfway Street (offsite Avery Hill), Radfield Way, Croyde Close and Overmead.

== Geography ==
Sidcup lies 2.8 miles (4.5 km) south-west of Bexleyheath; 4 miles (6.4 km) north-east of Bromley; 3.3 miles (5.3 km) north of Orpington; 3.4 miles (5.5 km) north-west of Swanley.

== Demographics ==
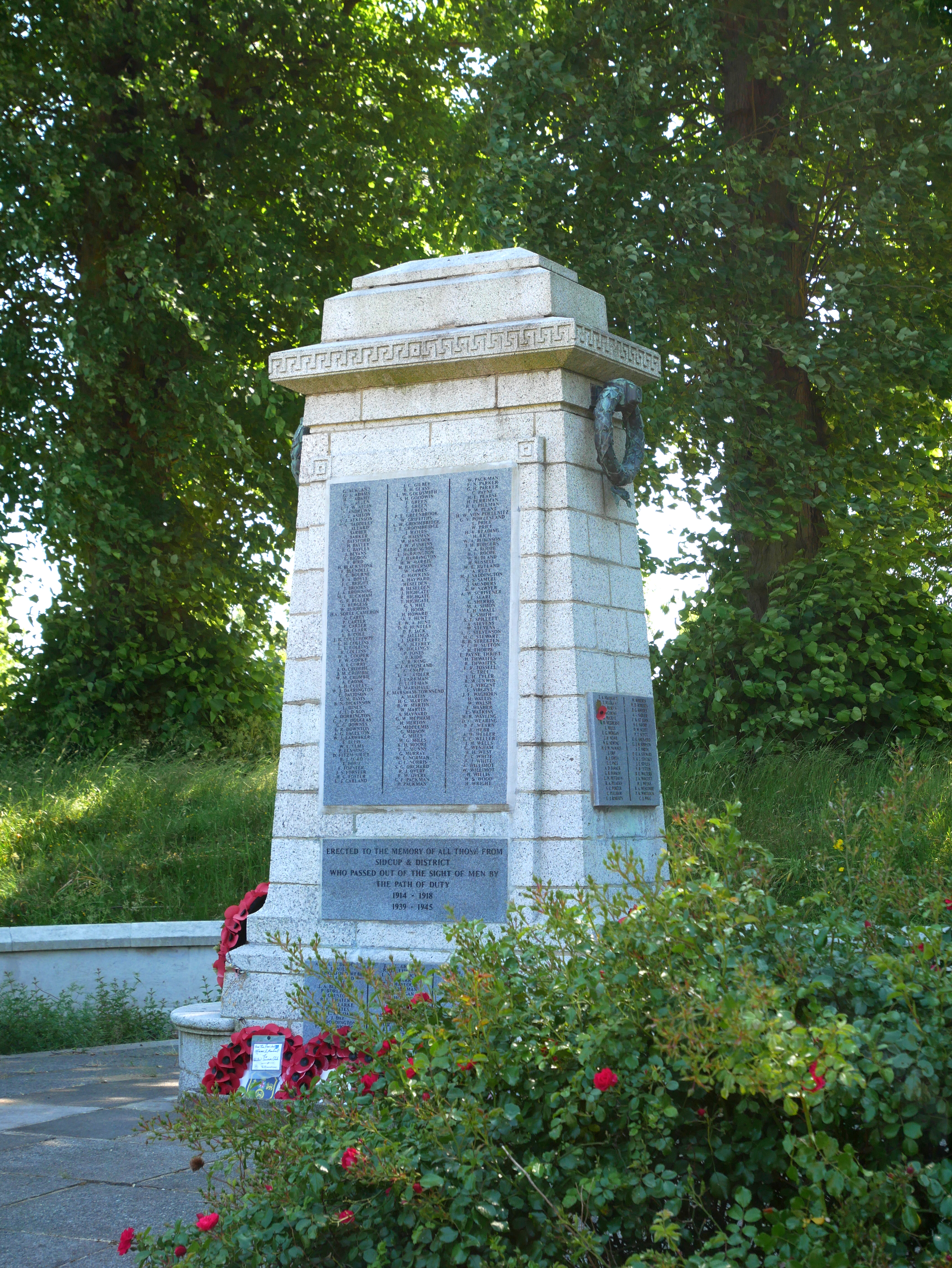
The war memorial on the Green at Sidcup

In 2021, the estimated population was given as 15,400. 18.5% of residents are aged 65+, slightly above the statistics for the whole of the London Borough of Bexley. At the census of 2021, the non-white population of Sidcup was recorded at 18.1%; the largest minority group were Asian or Asian British (7.0% of the total population). The percentage of those who are separated or divorced (including dissolved civil partnerships) was 11.0%, just above that of the entire borough at 10.6%. 48.5% reported Christianity as their religious belief which was lower than the borough average, with 'No religion' being the second largest category at 38.8%, higher than the borough average of 33.6%.

== Education ==
Primary schools in Sidcup include: Birkbeck, Burnt Oak Junior School, Chatsworth, Days Lane, Holy Trinity Lamorbey, Longlands, Orchard School, Our Lady of the Rosary, Royal Park, Sherwood Park, and St Peter Chanel.

Secondary schools in Sidcup include Chislehurst and Sidcup Grammar School, Blackfen, Cleeve Park, Hurstmere and Kemnal Technology College.

Bird College, Christ the King: St Mary's (RC) Sixth Form College, and Rose Bruford College all have sites in Sidcup.

== Healthcare ==
Sidcup Cottage Hospital was opened in 1882 in Birkbeck Road, Sidcup. The building soon became too small and new premises were opened on the corner of Birkbeck and Granville Road in 1890. The premises became financially unviable and closed in 1974. The building was demolished and Sidcup Health Centre, now known as the Barnard Medical Practice was erected in the site.

Notable staff included:

- Alice Fortune Hodgson (1881-1942), Matron from 1913 until at least September 1939. Hodgson trained at The London Hospital under Matron Eva Luckes between 1903-1905. She remained there as a private nurse, undertook her midwifery training, and worked as a staff nurse before she left in 1908. As Matron Hodgson and the nursing staff were present when a long term in patient was confirmed into the Church of England by the Bishop of Rochester in 1931.

Queen Mary's Hospital was opened in 1917 with 300 beds in a number of wooden huts. Until 1925 it was the central military hospital for the reconstructive surgery of war veterans, led by Sir Harold Gillies The original hospital closed in 1929, being reopened as a general hospital in 1930 by Queen Mary, after whom it was named. A new building was opened in 1965. Since 2013 it has been managed by the Oxleas NHS Foundation Trust.

== Sport and leisure ==
Sidcup has a Non-League football club Sporting Club Thamesmead F.C. who play at the Sporting Club Thamesmead. On Sydney Road, there is a Sidcup Sports Club, housing the local rugby and cricket clubs.

An earlier Sidcup club, New Crusaders F.C., won the Southern Amateur Football League before the First World War.

Sidcup also has a Leisure Centre on Hurst Road with 2 pools and a gym.

The Sidcup and District Motor Cycle Club was formed at the Station Hotel, Sidcup in 1928. The club owns the Canada Heights motorcycle sport venue in Button Street, Swanley.

== Culture, identity and community ==
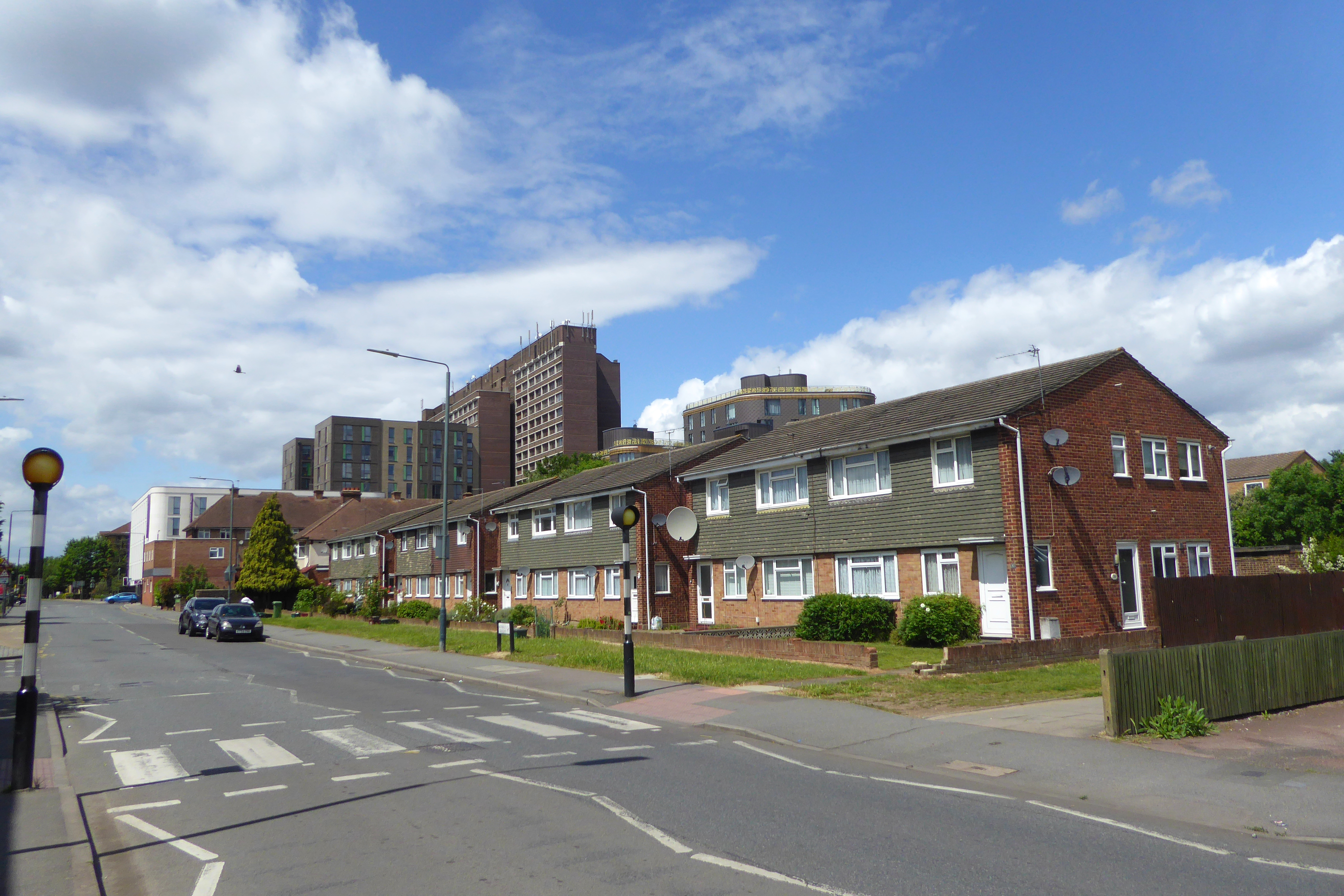
Buildings along Faraday Avenue, reflecting a mix of high-rise and low-rise buildings in the area around Sidcup railway station. In the background is the 14-storey Marlowe House, a Metropolitan Police administration building housing their Museum and Historic Vehicle Collection.

Sidcup is home to the Rose Bruford College of drama and Bird College, both of which have several famous alumni, and the Sidcup Symphony Orchestra, which also serves the wider South East London area. In an interview with Lake Bell (who studied at Rose Bruford College) in 2015, comedian James Corden described Sidcup as "the armpit of England" on his late night American chat show The Late Late Show with James Corden.

The murder of teenager Rob Knox at the Metro Bar on Station Road in 2008 was national headline news. Knox was an aspiring actor who had, just before his death, filmed a small part in Harry Potter and the Half-Blood Prince. He was killed protecting his brother from a group of youths. His murderer, Karl Bishop, also from Sidcup, was later found guilty of murder and sentenced. Following Knox's death, his family have campaigned to end knife crime among young people. The Rob Knox Foundation has organised a Rob Knox Film Festival in Sidcup and the neighbouring town of Bexleyheath, and a bench was dedicated to Knox at St John's Church in Sidcup in 2015.

== Politics and government ==
Sidcup is part of the Old Bexley and Sidcup constituency for elections to the House of Commons, currently represented by Louie French from the Conservative Party.

Sidcup is part of the Sidcup ward for elections to London Borough of Bexley.

== Transport ==
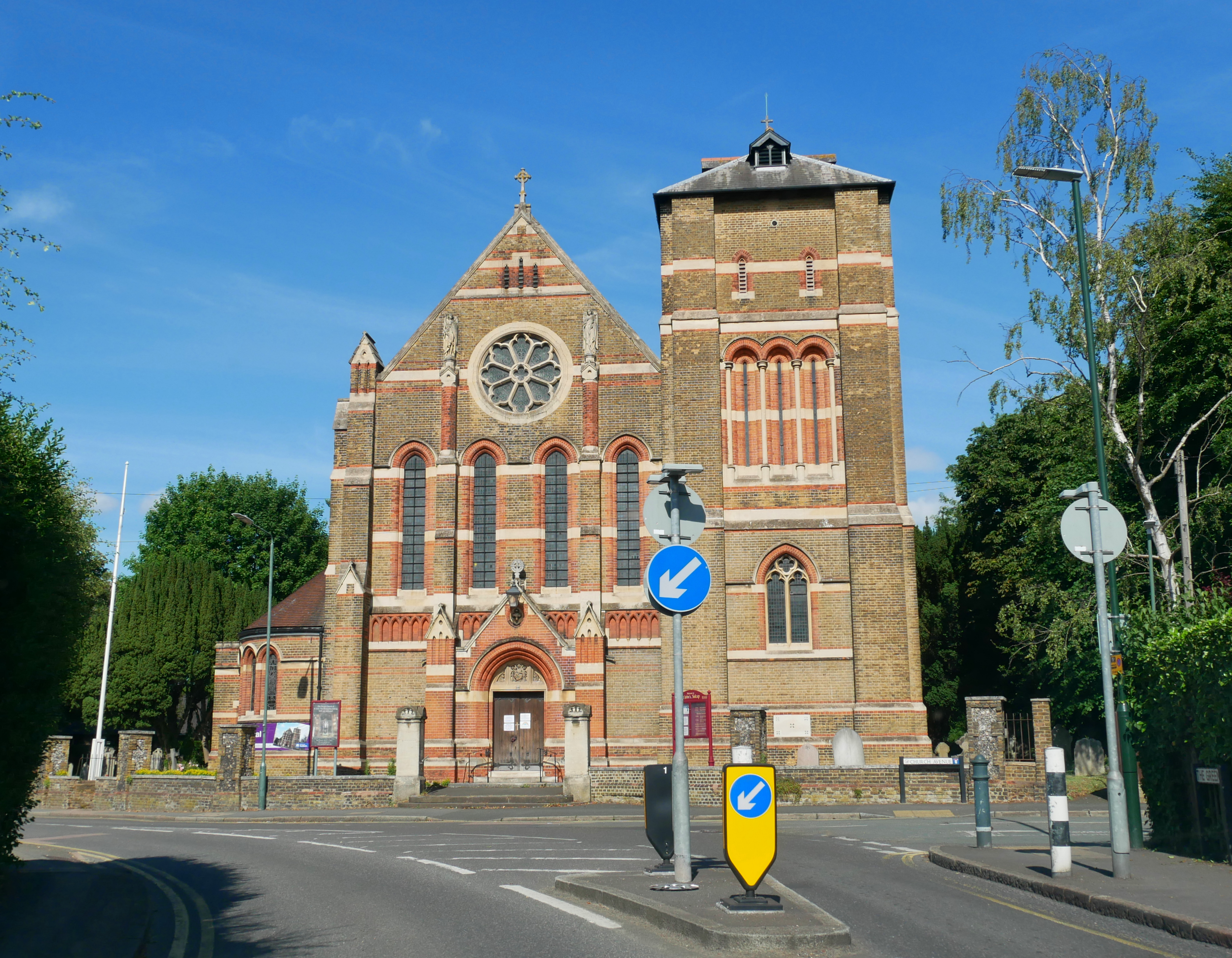
The Church of Saint John the Evangelist, the main Anglican congregation in Sidcup

=== National Rail ===
Sidcup railway station opened in October 1866, a month after the opening of the Dartford Loop Line on 1 September 1866. It is 1 mile (1.6 km) north of Sidcup town centre. The station provides the area with Southeastern services to London Charing Cross and to Gravesend.

=== Roads ===
Sidcup High Street is on the A211, following in length the old London – Maidstone – Hythe road. The A211 starts just at the eastern end of Eltham High Street, running through New Eltham, then alongside the A20 Sidcup By-pass before ending at Foots Cray, where the B2173 continues towards Swanley along the former A20 road. The A211 connects the two main roads in this district; Station Road and Main Road.

East Rochester Way on the A2 road runs partly through the district, adjoining Blackfen Road. This road provides links to the Blackwall Tunnel and Kent.

=== Buses ===
Sidcup is served by a number of Transport for London bus routes, namely the 51, 160, 229, 233, 269, 286, 321, 492, 625, 669, B14, R11 and SL3. These connect Sidcup with areas including Bexleyheath, Bromley, Catford, Crayford, Chislehurst, Dartford, Eltham, Greenwich, Erith, Lewisham, New Cross, Orpington, Swanley, Thamesmead, Welling & Woolwich.

== Notable residents ==
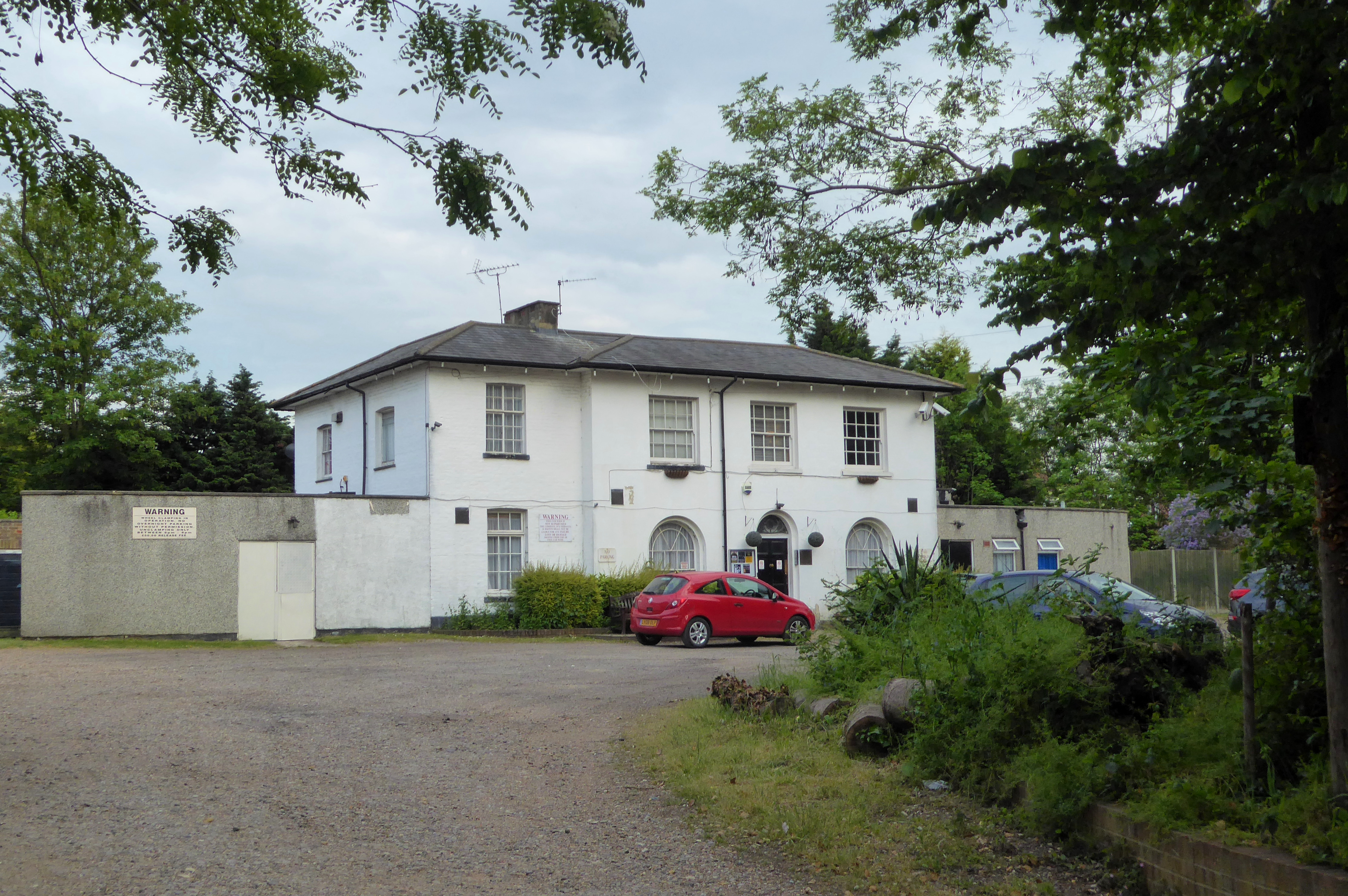
The 19th-century mansion house of Abbeyhill in Sidcup, now a Grade II listed building

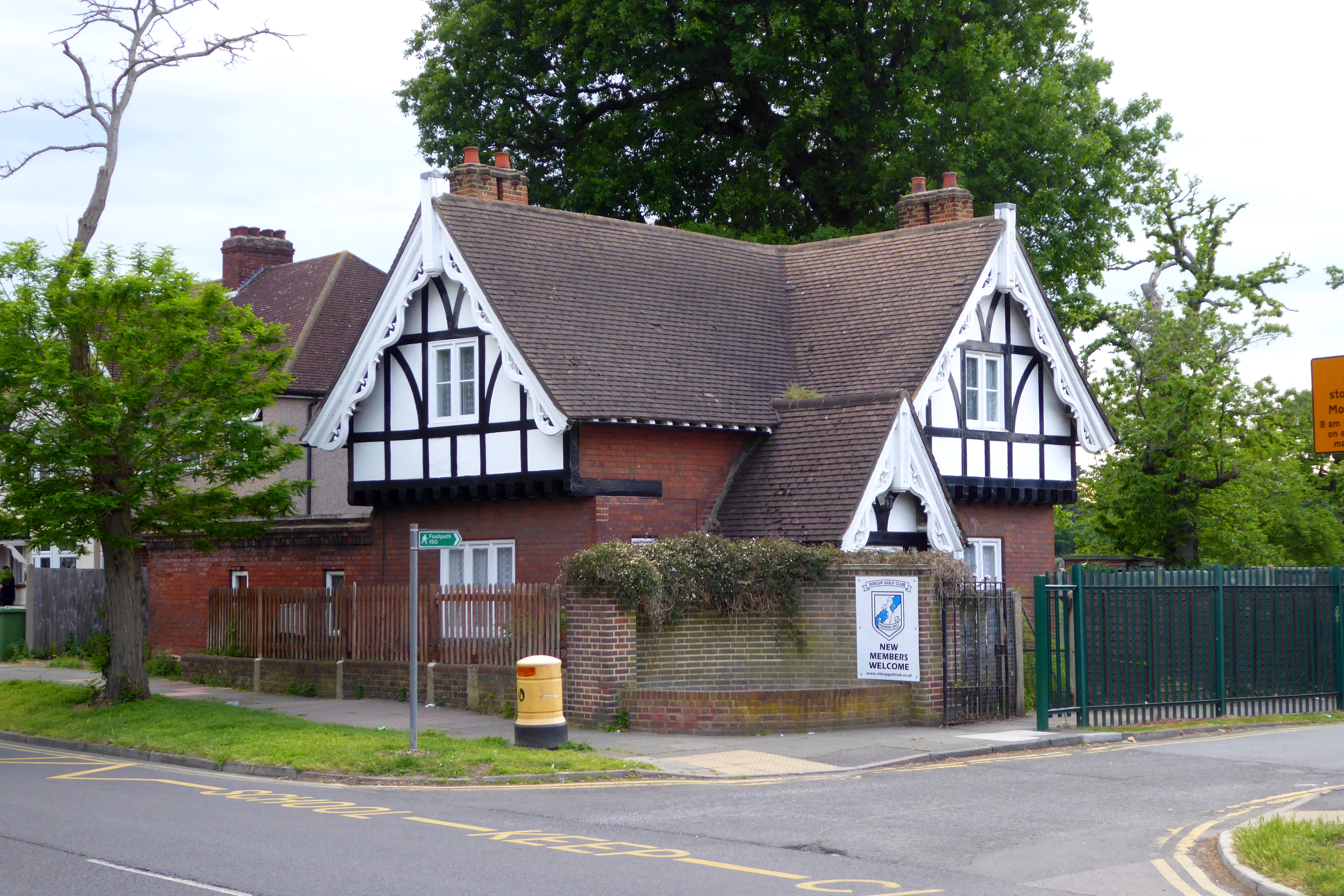
A 19th-century lodge in Sidcup, now a Grade II listed building

- F. Matthias Alexander (1869–1955), Australian actor and inventor of the Alexander technique, lived in Penhill House, Sidcup, for 30 years
- Harry Arter (1989–) footballer (Bournemouth F.C. and Republic of Ireland), born in Sidcup
- Steve Backley (1969–), Olympic javelin silver medallist, born in Sidcup
- Gareth Bacon (1972–), politician and leader of the Conservative Party in the Greater London Assembly
- Sam Bailey (1977–), winning contestant, The X Factor, grew up in Sidcup
- Angela Barnes (1976–) actress, stand-up comedian, born in Sidcup
- Christopher Battarbee (1975–), cricketer (Oxford University), born in Sidcup
- Lake Bell (1979–), American actress, lived in Sidcup while studying at Rose Bruford College in the 1990s.
- Doreen Bird (1928–2004), dance teacher, lived in Sidcup and established Bird College
- Quentin Blake (1932–), illustrator, artist, born in Sidcup
- Denis Bond (1946–), children's author, actor and scriptwriter, lives in Sidcup
- Tom Burns (1944–), Catholic bishop, lived and ministered in Sidcup and taught at St Mary's School in the 1970s
- Garry Bushell (1955–), journalist, lives in Sidcup
- George Albert Cairns (1913–44), recipient of the last Victoria Cross of World War II, lived and worked in Sidcup
- Sheila Callender (1914–2004), haematologist, born in Sidcup
- Ben Chorley (1982–), footballer, born in Sidcup
- Charlie Clements (1987–), actor (EastEnders), born in Sidcup
- Jason Crowe (1978–), footballer, born in Sidcup
- Jay Darlington (1968–), musician (former keyboardist for the band Kula Shaker and currently a member of the band Magic Bus), born in Sidcup
- Ian Davenport (1966–), abstract painter and former Turner Prize nominee, born in Sidcup
- Douglas Harries (1893–1972), Royal Air Force air vice-marshal and first-class cricketer
- Joe Healy (1986–), footballer who previously played in the Football League for Millwall, born in Sidcup
- Deren Ibrahim (1991–), Gibraltarian footballer, born in Sidcup
- Alfred Garth Jones (1872–1955), illustrator, spent the last years of his life in Sidcup
- John Paul Jones (1946–), bass guitarist (Led Zeppelin), born in Sidcup
- Rob Knox (1989–2008), actor, murdered in Sidcup
- Ronald Lampitt (1906-1988), illustrator, lived in Sidcup
- Douglas Macmillan (1884–1969), founder of Macmillan Cancer Support, lived in Knoll Road from 1924 until 1966, and also ran his charity from that address. Bexley Civic Society placed a blue plaque on the house in 2010
- Ivan Magill (1888–1986), innovative anaesthetist, worked in Sidcup
- Lee Murray (1977–), former kickboxer and mixed martial arts champion, convicted of the Securitas depot robbery, lived in Sidcup
- Emma Noble (1971–), model and actress, born in Sidcup
- Mike Rann (1953–), Premier of South Australia, politician, born in Sidcup, lived in Blackfen prior to emigrating to New Zealand with his parents
- John Regis (1966–), Olympic sprinter, lived in Sidcup
- Mark Ricketts (1984–), footballer, born in Sidcup
- Wayne Routledge (1985–), footballer, born in Sidcup
- Gerard Shelley (1891–1980), author, translator and Catholic bishop, born in Sidcup
- Nevil Shute (1899–1960), novelist and aeronautical engineer, lived in Hatherley Road from 1924 to 1930 while working at Vickers in Crayford
- Ethel Smyth (1858–1944), composer and suffragette, born in St. John's Road, Sidcup
- Thomas Townshend, 1st Viscount Sydney (1733–1800), politician and Cabinet minister, lived in Frognal House, Foots Cray
- Gordon Watson (1971–), former Sheffield Wednesday footballer, born in Sidcup
- Elizabeth Wiskemann (1899–1971), historian and journalist, born in Sidcup
- Doug Wright (1914–98), cricketer (Kent and England), born in Sidcup

=== Fictional residents ===
- In the Harold Pinter play The Caretaker, Davies repeatedly says that "all his papers" are in Sidcup, and he will return there, but is "waiting for the weather to break".
- Roderick Spode — fictional politician and fashion designer, was the 7th Earl of Sidcup in the Jeeves stories by P. G. Wodehouse.

== Bibliography ==
- Mercer, John (1994). Sidcup: A Pictorial History. Chichester: Phillimore & Co. ISBN 978-0-850-33907-9.
- Mercer, John (2013). Sidcup & Foots Cray: A History. Stroud: Amberley Publishing. ISBN 978-1-445-61195-2.
