= Empress State Building =

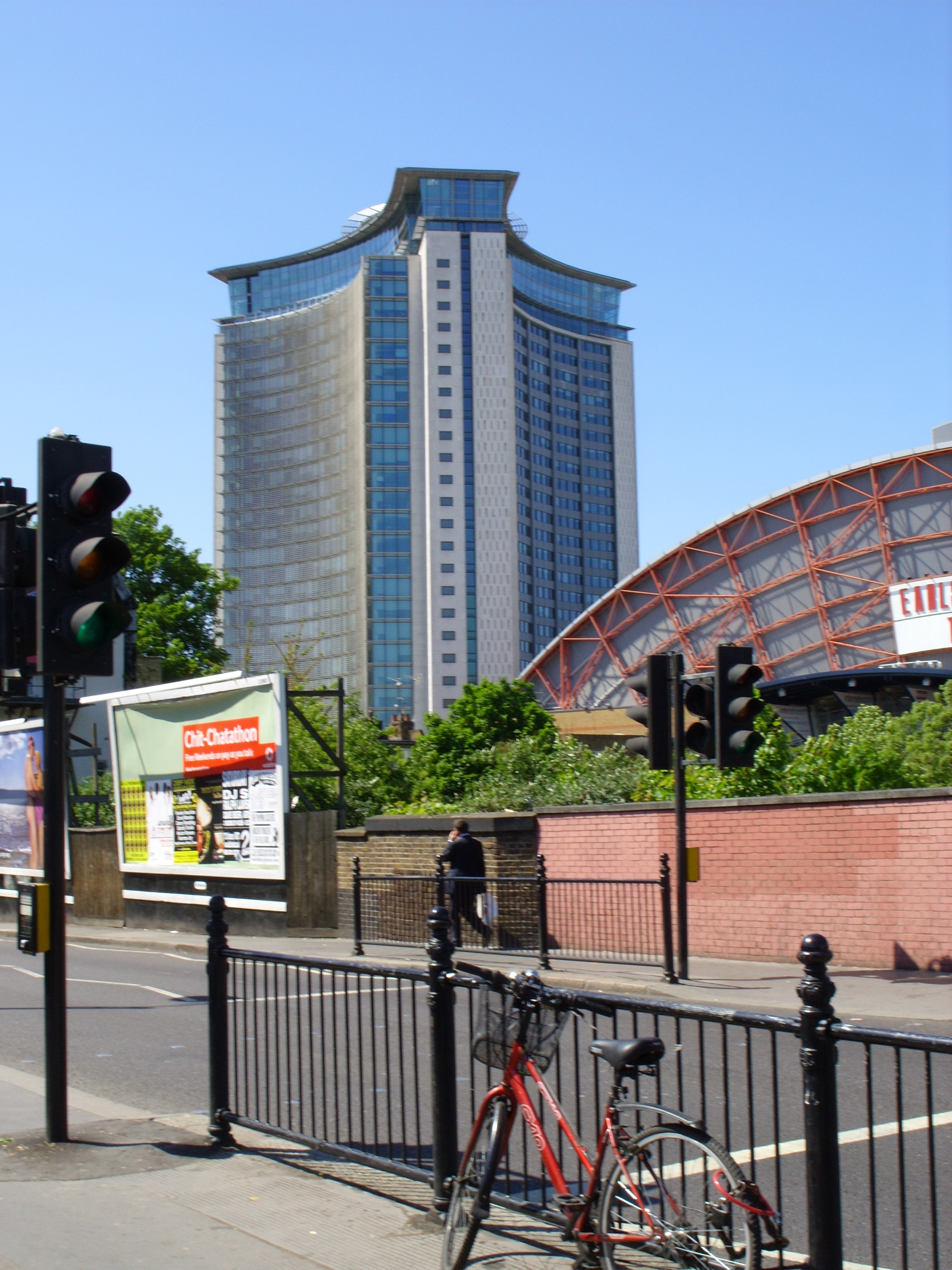
- The Empress State Building as seen from outside West Brompton station, with the former Earls Court Two in the foreground.
- Interactive map of the Empress State Building area

General information
- Location: West Brompton, London, England
- Coordinates: 51°29′14.9″N 00°11′59.1″W
- Construction started: November 1959
- Completed: July 1961
- Owner: Metropolitan Police

The Empress State Building is a high rise building in West Brompton in the London Borough of Hammersmith and Fulham, on the border with Earl's Court. Its full address is Empress State Building, Empress Approach, Lillie Road, West Brompton, London, SW6 1TR.

== History ==
The building is named after the Empress Hall which formerly stood on the site, and in tribute to the Empire State Building. It was completed in 1962 for the Admiralty on the site of the former Empress Hall and ice rink as a commercial building and was 328 feet (100.0 m) tall with 28 floors, designed by Stone, Toms & Partners and was briefly the tallest commercial building in London until Millbank Tower was built later in 1962. It was renovated in 2003 to a design by Wilkinson Eyre Architects. Three floors were added. As a result, the tower's height rose to 358 feet (109.1 m). The project also included a 5.5 metres main-south-face floor extension from floors 3 to 26 and the addition of 'Orbit', a private revolving bar on the top floor which offers panoramic views of London.

This building was originally designed as a hotel but was first used by the Admiralty and GCHQ. The Directorate of Naval Shore Telecommunications (formerly the Naval Shore Telecommunications Authority) had their national headquarters in the building in the 1980s and 1990s, as did the Directorate of Fleet Supply Duties.

== Metropolitan Police offices ==
The building is occupied by staff from the Metropolitan Police Service who refer to it as ESB. Among other things, until 2020 the building was home to the assessment centre for prospective police officers. Some of the upper floors were occupied by staff from Transport for London until 2010. An annexe at the entrance to the site housed the Metropolitan Police Heritage Centre until January 2020.

In March 2018 the London mayor's office agreed to buy the ESB estate for its MPS operations from Capco Plc, the developer of the adjacent Earl's Court regeneration scheme, for £250 million to house a new Counter Terrorism Operations Centre. Funding for that project was confirmed in November 2020, from 23 December 2024 the building is designated as a Prohibited Place under The National Security Act 2023, it is expected to re-open in that role by late 2025.

On 15 October 2019 the building received a certificate of immunity from listing by the then Secretary of State for Digital, Culture, Media and Sport, Nicky Morgan, which expired on 14 October 2024.

== See also ==
- Tall buildings in London
