= Christopher Battarbee =

English cricketer (born 1975)

Personal information
- Full name: Christopher Mark Battarbee
- Born: 11 April 1975 (age 51); Sidcup, Kent, England
- Batting: Right-handed
- Bowling: Right-arm medium

Domestic team information
- Years: Team
- 1997: Oxford University

Career statistics
Competition	First-class
Matches	7
Runs scored	29
Batting average	14.50
100s/50s	–/–
Top score	10*
Balls bowled	904
Wickets	11
Bowling average	57.00
5 wickets in innings	–
10 wickets in match	–
Best bowling	2/56
Catches/stumpings	1/–
- Source: Cricinfo, 25 December 2019

Christopher Mark Battarbee (born 11 April 1975) is a former English first-class cricketer.

Born at Sidcup in April 1975, Battarbee attended Keble College, Oxford. While studying at Oxford, he played first-class cricket for Oxford University in 1997, making seven appearances. Playing as a right-arm medium pace bowler, he took 11 wickets at an average of 57.00, with best figures of 2 for 56. After graduating from Oxford, Battarbee became a schoolteacher. He is the current head of geography at Tonbridge School.
