= Metropolitan Police Historic Vehicle Collection =

The Austin 1100 and Rover SD1 from the MPHVC at an event at the London Transport Museum Depot in Acton in 2017.

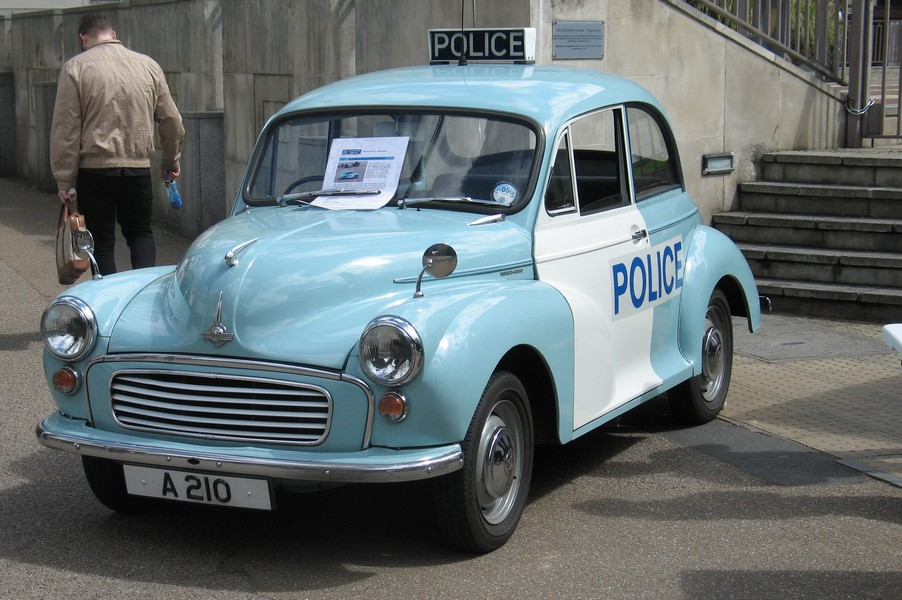
The Morris Minor from the MPHVC on the South Bank, 2015.

The Metropolitan Police Historic Vehicle Collection (MPHVC) is a collection of motorcycles and 14 historic cars owned and used for outreach events by the Metropolitan Police. It was housed at Hampton Traffic Garage until 2014, then Hendon Police College until 2023, when it moved to its present home at Marlowe House, Sidcup. It includes cars by Triumph and Land Rover.

== Selected vehicles ==
- Wolseley 18/85, 1948
- Austin 1100
- Morris Minor 1000, 1970
- Special Branch Rover P6, 1973
- Rover SD1, 1983
