= West Brompton =

Area of west London, England

Coordinates: 51.4861°N 0.1944°W

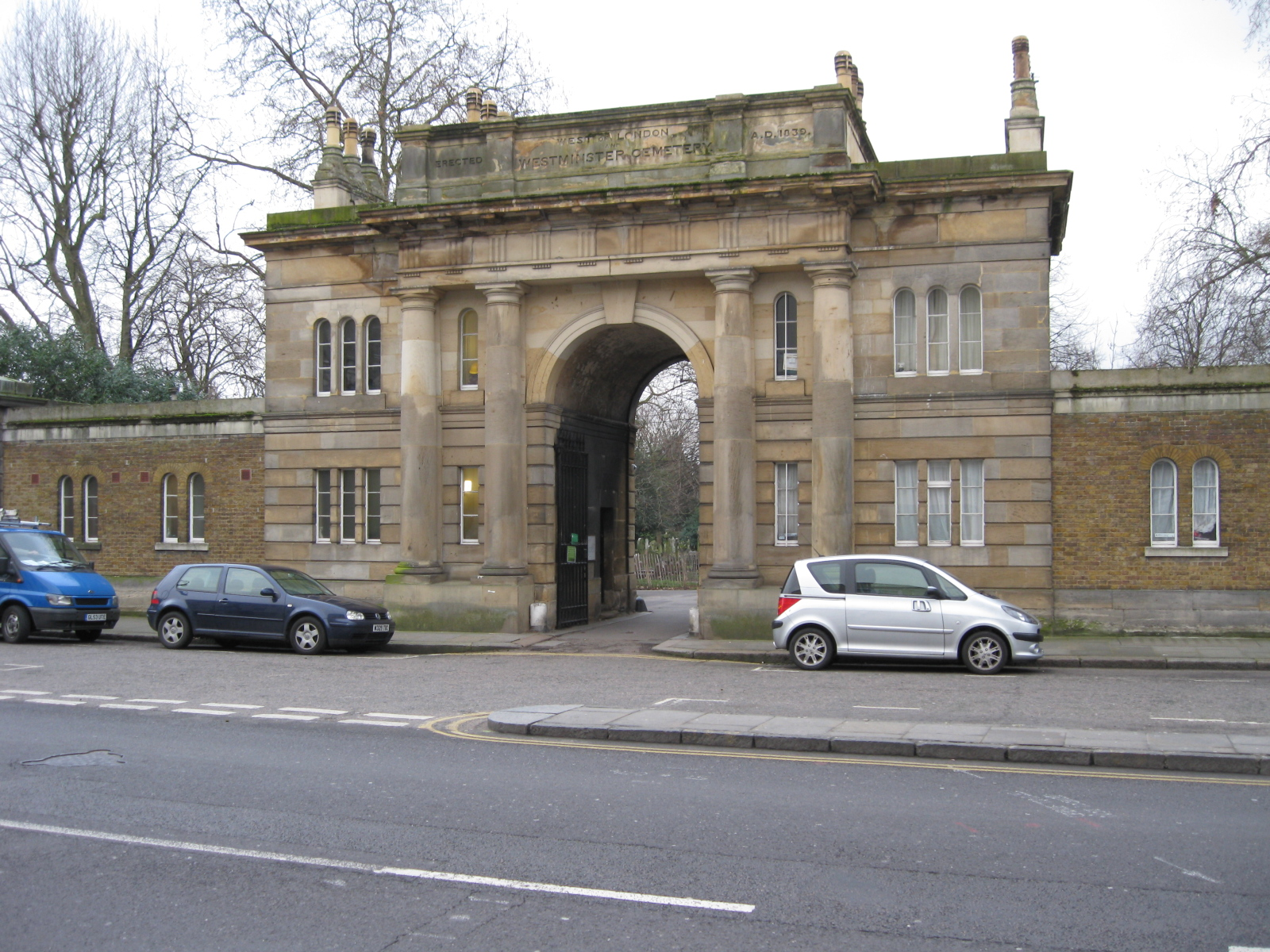
- Gate of Brompton Cemetery on Old Brompton Road

- Location within Greater London
- OS grid reference: TQ253779
- London borough: Kensington & Chelsea; Hammersmith & Fulham
- Ceremonial county: Greater London
- Region: London
- Country: England
- Sovereign state: United Kingdom
- Post town: LONDON
- Postcode district: SW5, SW6, SW10
- Dialling code: 020
- Police: Metropolitan
- Fire: London
- Ambulance: London
- UK Parliament: Chelsea and Fulham, Hammersmith
- London Assembly: West Central

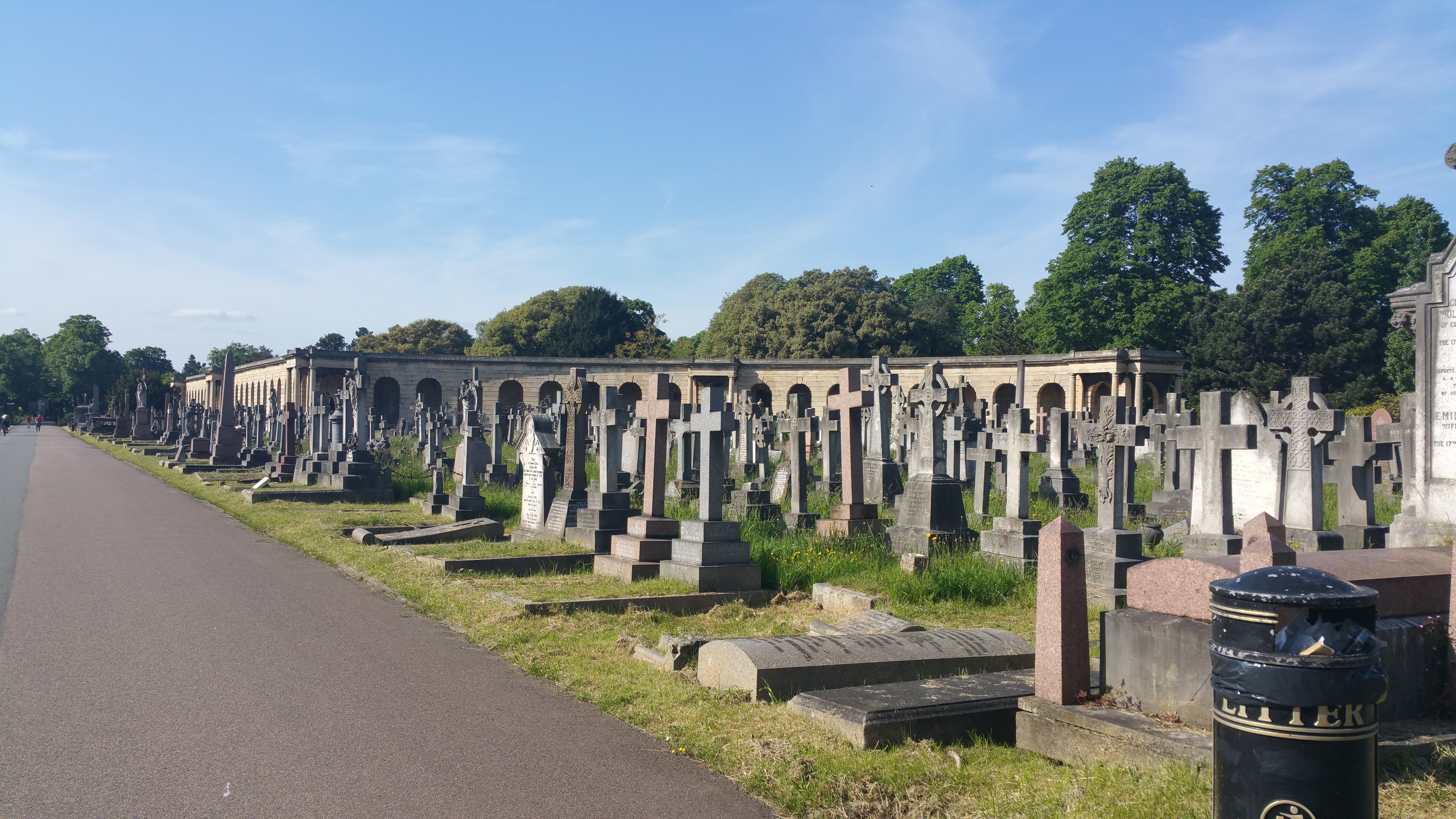
Brompton Cemetery, 2018

West Brompton is an area of west London, England, that straddles the boundary between the London Borough of Hammersmith and Fulham and Royal Borough of Kensington and Chelsea. The centuries-old boundary traced by Counter's Creek, probably marked the eastern edge of Fulham Manor since Saxon times and is now partly lost beneath the West London Line railway.

== History ==
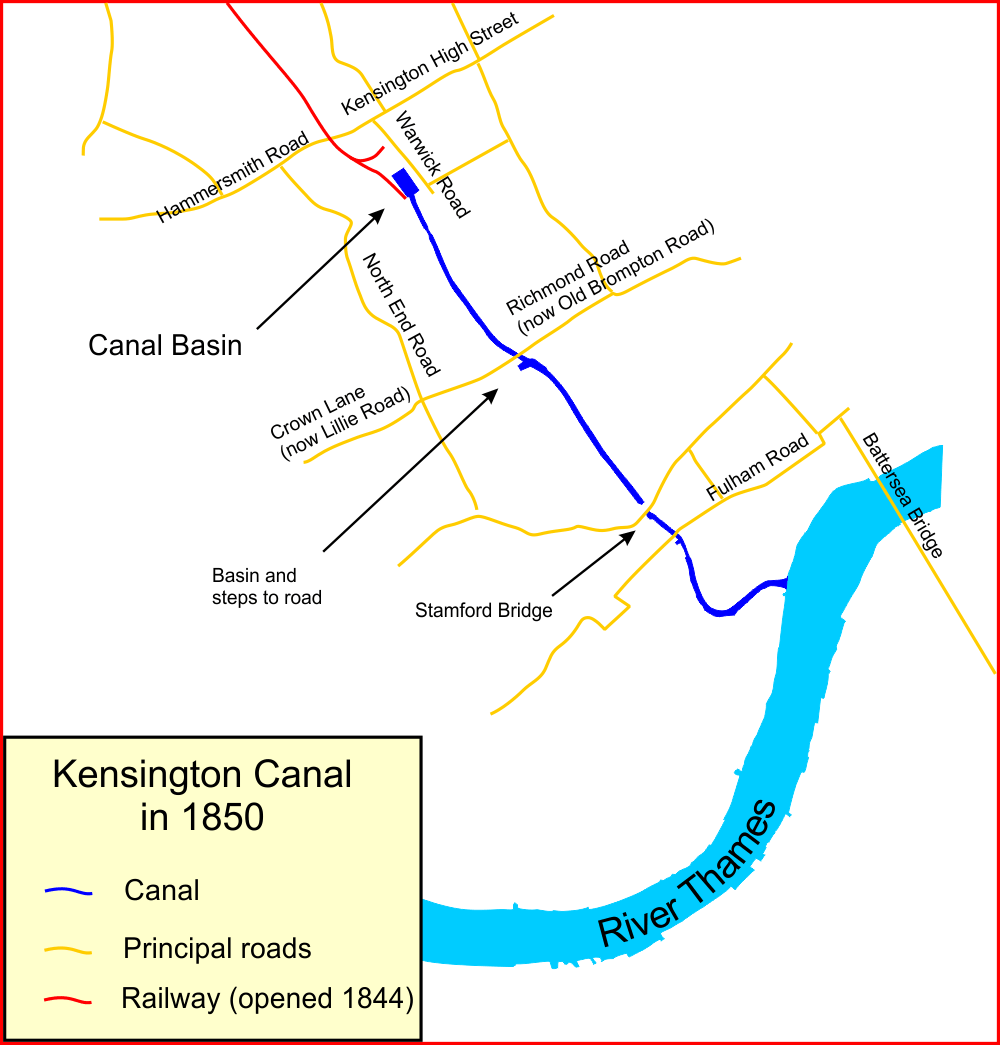
The Kensington Canal 1850 or Counter's Creek

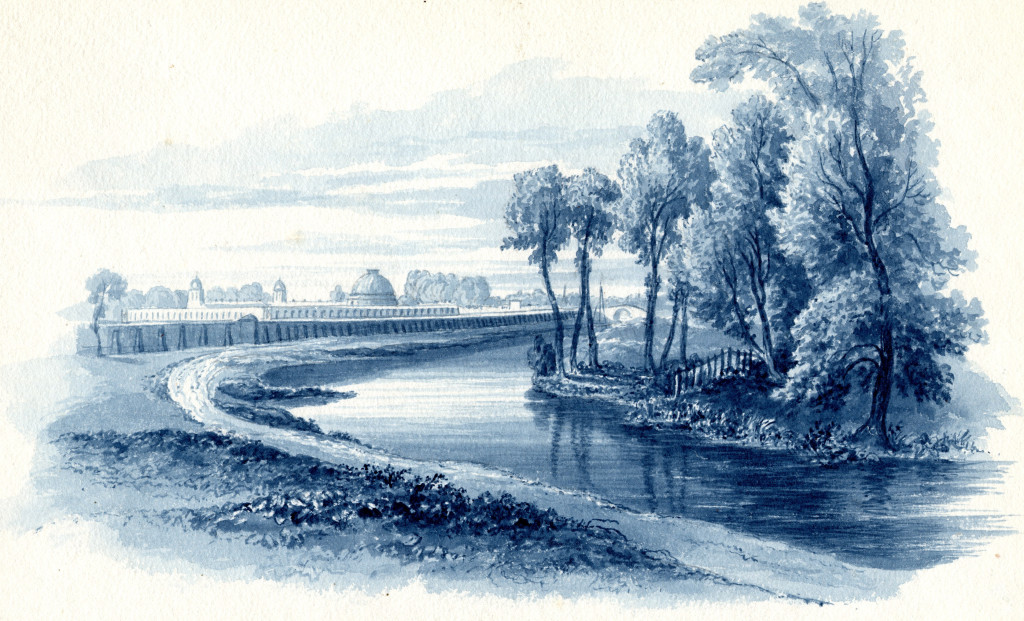
The Kensington Canal by William Cowen c. 1845

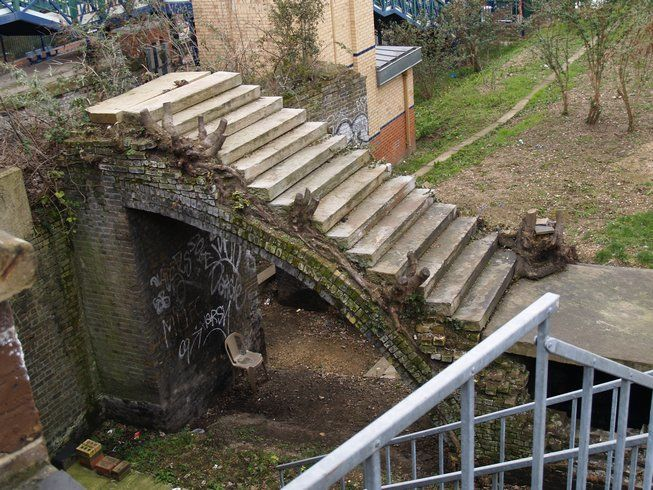
1826 steps to the old canal port west of West Brompton station

The land to the west of Counter's Creek lies in the medieval parish of Fulham which evolved out of the extensive Fulham Manor, the residence of the Bishop of London for 1,300 years, known today as Fulham Palace. To the east is the parish of St Mary Abbots which traces its foundation to the 12th-century as the Manor of Kensington. Until modern times, both sides of the creek were in the county of Middlesex.

The name refers to the locality of Brompton to the east, linked to its western namesake through the areas of Earl's Court and South Kensington by the Old Brompton Road. Before the vigorous urbanisation of the second half of the 19th century, Brompton also referred to the area between the Fulham Road, previously known as Little Chelsea and Counter's Creek to the West, on its way to the Thames. The most famous landmark in the area is the Grade I listed Brompton Cemetery, laid out between 1837 and 1839, with magnificent catacombs and a domed chapel by architect, Benjamin Baud. Since the area was chiefly devoted to market gardens, with leading nurseries such as that of James Veitch & Sons, philanthropists looking to establish hospitals near London. looked no further than Brompton as a suitable healthy location. Thus came into being the Royal Brompton Hospital, for chest diseases. Ten years later, William Marsden decided to erect a new Cancer Hospital in memory of his wife, and a tract of land was found for it along the Fulham Road in Brompton. Designed by Messrs John Young & Son, Architects, and built by the Lawrence Company in 1859, it has subsequently achieved world renown as The Royal Marsden Hospital. Notable residents of West Brompton include the naturalist, writer and illustrator, Beatrix Potter, William Hurlstone (1876–1906), English composer born in Empress Place, and Benjamin Rawlinson Faulkner (1787–1849), reputedly Queen Victoria's favourite portrait painter.

=== The advent of a canal and a road ===
The most notable landowners in 'West Brompton' at the start of the 19th century were James Gunter (1731–1819), Sir John Scott Lillie (1790–1868) and the Edwardes family. The first non-agrarian activity in the area was to the West of Counter's Creek, which between 1828 and 1859 became the short-lived, two-mile long Kensington Canal. This area of farm land, bounded by North End Lane to the West, was known then as North End in the Parish of Fulham and was dotted with a few grand houses, such as the Hermitage and the less grand Grange, home of artist, Edward Burne-Jones. A new road was laid out to join North End and Kensington parish with access to the new Hammersmith Bridge by Sir John Scott Lillie, Peninsular War veteran, road builder and investor in the canal company. Lillie is buried in Brompton Cemetery. After Gunter's Bridge was built over the canal in 1826, the road on either side was called the Richmond Road. The remnants of the canal bridge can be seen from platform 4 at the West Brompton station. The early Fulham buildings were associated with freight transport such as the wharves in today's Rickett Street and Roxby Place, south of Lillie Road, and a brewery to offer refreshment to the canal, barge and later railway workers as well as the builders of the nearby Westminster and Brompton Company's new 40 acre cemetery opened in 1840. The oldest extant building is the Lily Langtry public house, formerly the Lillie Arms 1833, part of the old brewery in Lillie Road.

Meanwhile, the Kensington Canal turned out to be a financial fiasco for its backers trying to link the Grand Union Canal and the burgeoning railways with the Thames. They switched to the idea of a railway to benefit from the boom to the West and to the North, and the canal was filled in to make way for the West London (extension) Line 1840.

The earliest 'West Brompton' residential development was along the south side of Richmond Road (today's Lillie Road) and was called Lansdowne and Beaufort Villas in the 1840s, a group of Palladian style semi-detached houses with front and back gardens, now entirely demolished. These were followed in 1864 off its north side by a small terraced cul-de-sac abutting the railway with a number of attached retail outlets onto the main road, a development called Richmond Place, the current Empress Place (scheduled for demolition for a dense high rise development), and in 1866 by a terrace of more substantial houses along Richmond Road, both designed by the City of London architect, John Young, known for his signature ornamental brickwork. The houses would have been intended for the different levels of professionals, craftsmen and workers coming into London to service the growing transport and building booms. Indeed, the owners and residents of this Fulham housing development would soon be involved from 1872 in the massive urbanisation of the farmland estates of the Edwardes and Gunter families, over Lillie bridge.

=== The local railway boom ===
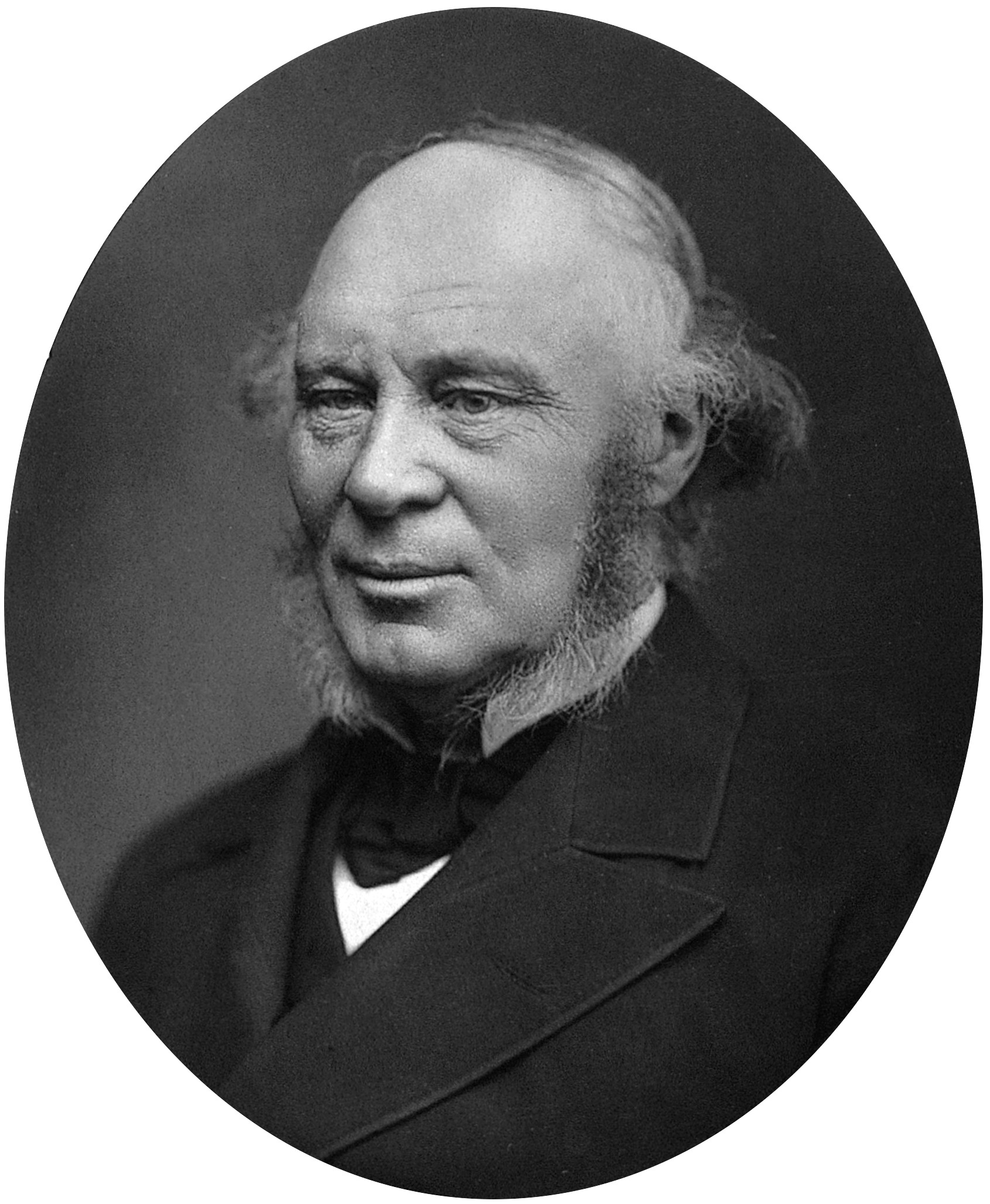
Sir John Fowler, civil engineer

Sir John Fowler, 1st Baronet, a civil engineer from Yorkshire took over as consulting engineer of the Metropolitan and District Railway following the early death of Brunel and was active in the area laying down tracks and building bridges and leading to the establishment in 1869 of the Lillie Bridge Depot and Railway Engineering works, currently being demolished to make way for a high rise development. Among his many famous designs is the West Brompton station opened in 1865. Fowler, like many people who contributed to the early development of the West Brompton area, is buried in Brompton Cemetery. Fortuitously, 16-18 Empress Place (at risk) housed, at the turn of the last century, the former engineering headquarters of the Great Northern, Piccadilly and Brompton Railway, from where the westward expansion of the Piccadilly line was planned and carried out.

West Brompton Station provides London Underground District line services to Wimbledon in a Southerly direction and Edgware Road and Upminster to the North and East. It is possible also to change at Earls Court (1 stop or a short walk) for District line services to Ealing Broadway and Richmond as well as Kensington Olympia. The West London Line also provides services between Willesden Junction and Clapham Junction, South Croydon and Gatwick airport.

=== The sports craze ===
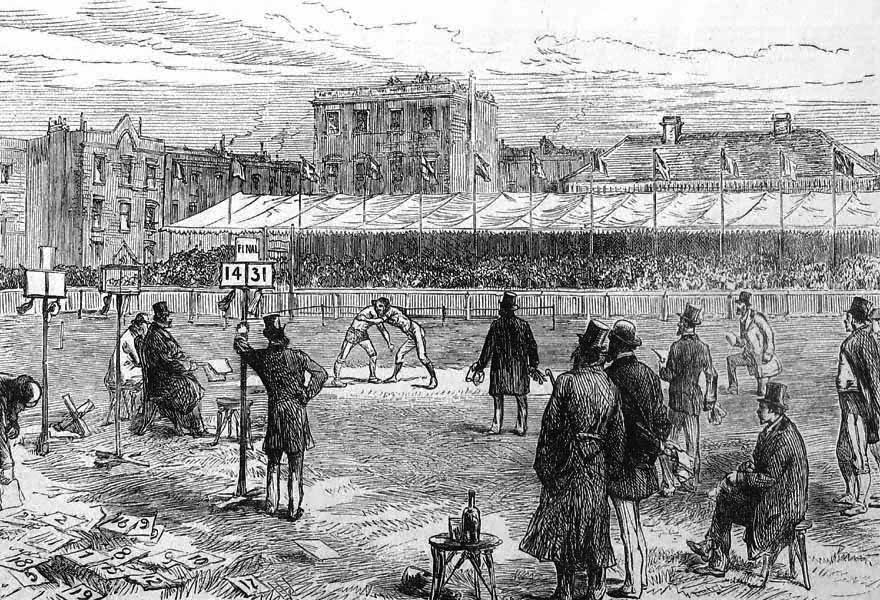
Lillie Bridge Sports Grounds with the former Lillie Arms pub prominent against the skyline

West Brompton F.C. was a 19th-century pioneer football team, who played in the defunct West London Cup along with the likes of Fulham F.C. and Queens Park Rangers F.C. Between 1869 and 1874 the Middlesex County Cricket Club had its home on the Lillie Grounds, prior to moving to Lord's in St John's Wood, where the turf was judged to be superior. Nevertheless, WG Grace scored a few centuries in West Brompton. John Chambers, who was himself a competitor and the moving force behind both the Amateur Athletics Club and developing the Lillie Bridge Grounds, is buried in Brompton Cemetery

=== The entertainment boom ===
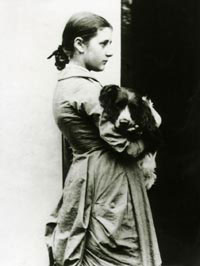
Beatrix Potter, aged fifteen with her spaniel, Spot, c.1881

John Robinson Whitley opened his Earl's Court exhibition and fair grounds here in 1887, with the entrance in West Brompton in Richmond Gardens at the bottom of Richmond Place, named subsequently, Empress Place in honour of Queen Victoria's visit to the grounds. His opening gambit was the American Wild West Show which coincided with the Queen's Golden Jubilee and featured William Cody, aka, Buffalo Bill and Annie Oakley along with a cortege of First Nation Americans. After Queen Victoria's personal attendance with her cortege on 9 May, the show became a runaway success. The show was not without tragedy, as three performers died during their tours. As a result, two Oglala Sioux Native Americans, 'Surrounded By the Enemy' and 'Red Penny', were buried in Brompton Cemetery. Red Penny was Little Chief and Good Robe's eighteen-month-old son. Brulé tribesman, Paul Eagle Star who died on 24 August 1891 at age twenty-seven due to complications from a horse-riding accident in Sheffield. Fifty-nine-year-old Oglala Sioux tribesman, Long Wolf died due to pneumonia during the Wild West Show's tour on 13 June 1892. Two months later, a two-year-old girl named White Star Ghost Dog lost her life when she fell from her mother's arms on a horse ride. All three of these Lakota Native Americans were buried in Brompton's cemetery. The coffins of Long Wolf, White Star Ghost Dog and Paul Eagle Star were exhumed to Pine Ridge and Rosebud, South Dakota in the late 1990s by their tribal descendants. Whitley did not make money on his venture and in 1894-5 he was replaced by the internationally successful Hungarian impresario, Imre Kiralfy who not only relaid the Earl's Court grounds but had erected the greatly popular Great Wheel (1894–1907), and the Empress Hall (1894) to accommodate 5,000 spectators who came to shows including spectaculars on ice. The venue was used for part of the 1948 Olympics. It survived until 1959 and is now the site of the Empress State Building (1961).

=== The suffragettes ===
In 1913 Mrs Pankhurst called one of her rallies in the local Empress Hall, just to the West of the Earls Court Exhibition Centre and former Exhibition Grounds. She too is buried in Brompton Cemetery. The Empress Hall was knocked down in the late 1950s and was replaced by the brutalist 30-storey Empress State Building in 1961.

== West Brompton today ==
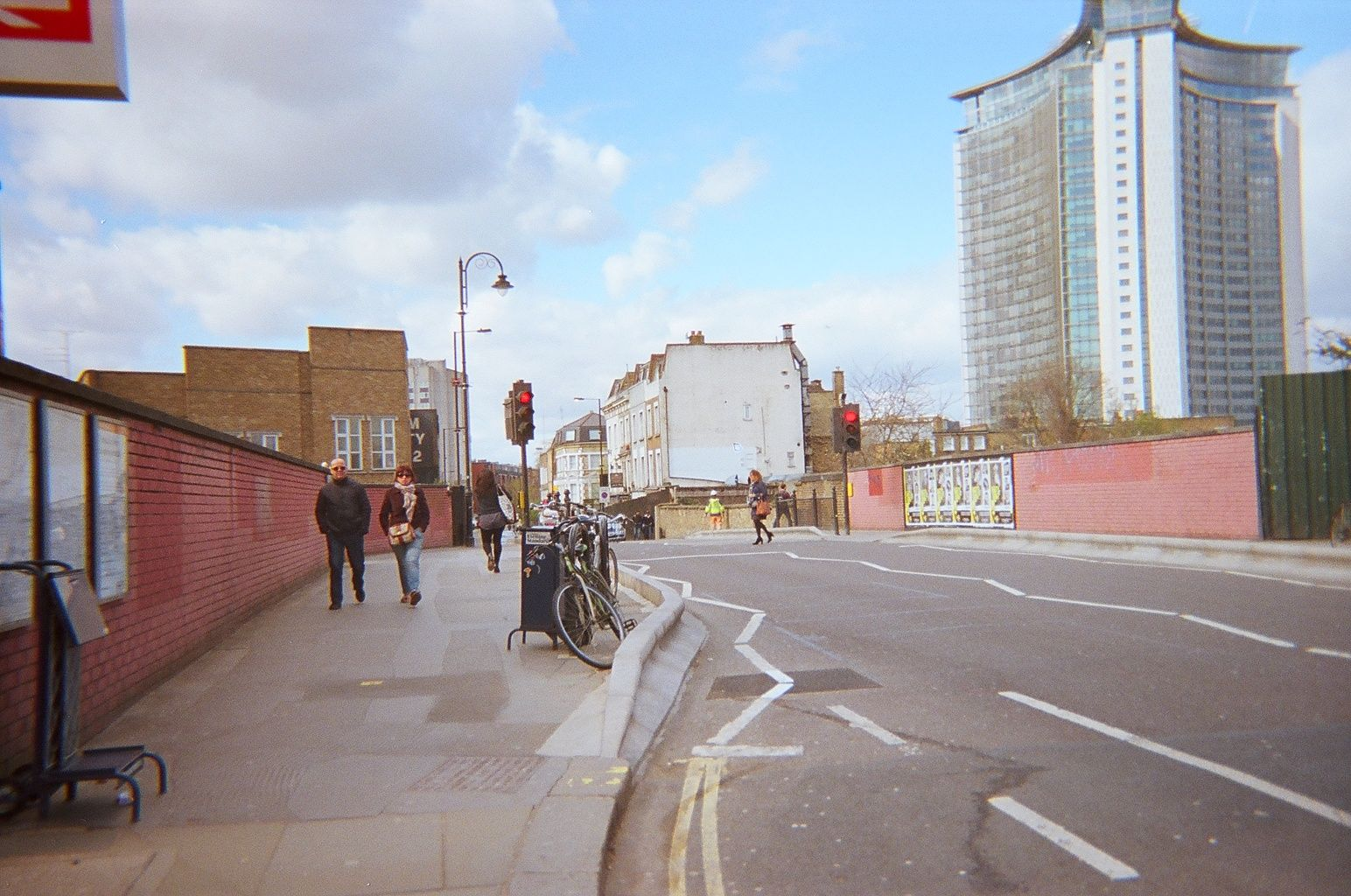
Lillie Bridge from West Brompton station

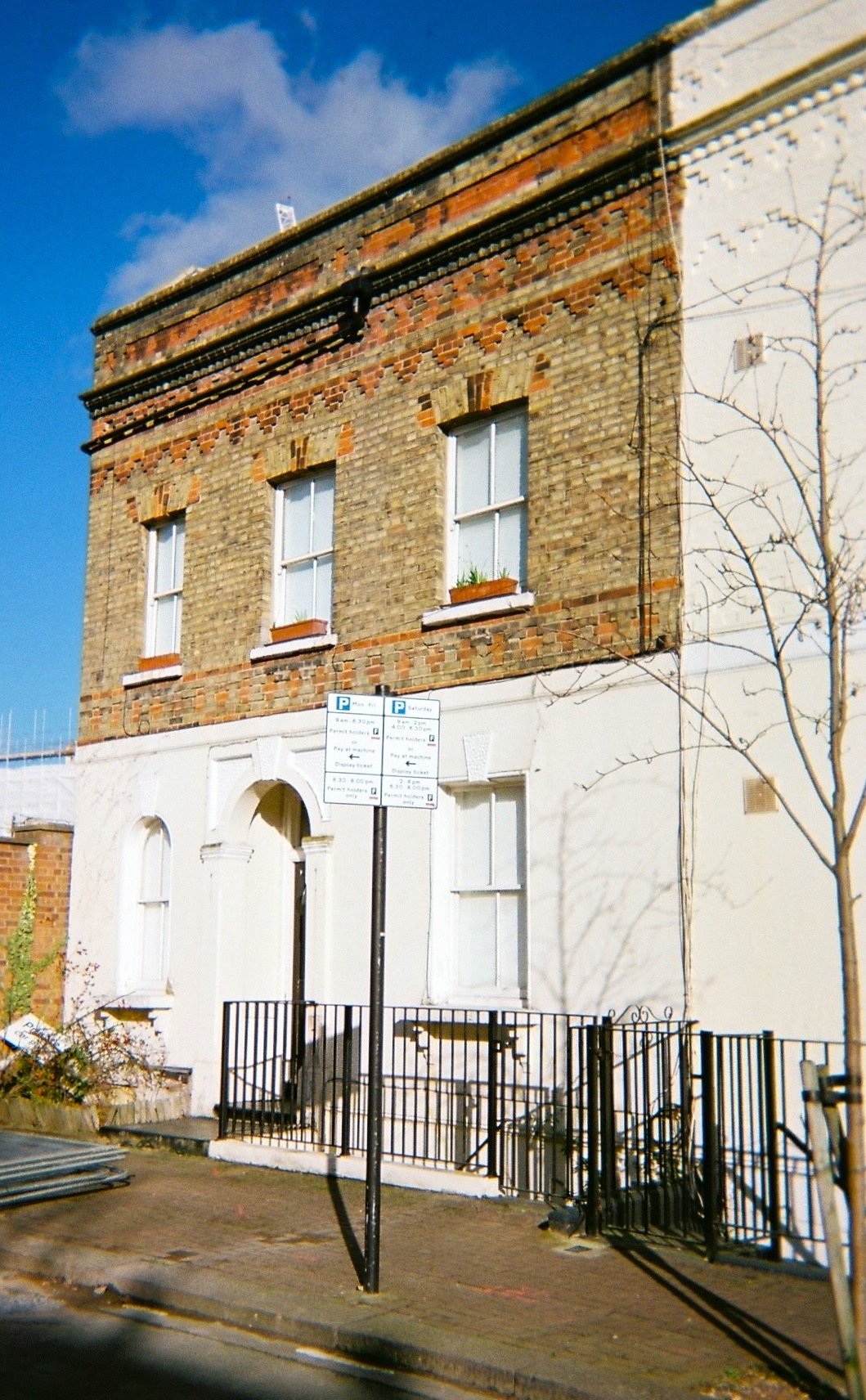
Polychromatic brick and stucco house (1865) in Empress Place SW6

West Brompton today is bounded by West Kensington and Earl's Court to the north, Chelsea to the east, Fulham Broadway to the south and Fulham to the west. It contains the historic 'Lillie Enclave' destined to be replaced, under the aegis of Mayor Boris Johnson, on its Western flank along with three social housing estates by an ambitious high rise development, trailed as four new 'villages' on decking, due to obliterate most of its existing biodiversity and history. Also included in the area are the Brompton Park Crescent estate, in the grounds of the old Fulham (Fever) Hospital, and its once associated Fulham Ambulance Station. One hospital ward block remains and appears to have been renamed "Lillie Bridge House" although it is a quarter of a mile from the bridge, down Seagrave Road. Also down that road are The London Oratory School, linked to Brompton Oratory, the Sedlescombe Conservation Area and a number of late Victorian streets of stucco terraces. These now front the dominating new high rise Lillie Square development emerging out of the erstwhile Athletics ground, latterly the Earl's Court exhibition car park, seeking to insert 'modern urban living' into this quiet, human scale and almost rural backwater, permanently obscuring the spires of the Redcliffe Square and Boltons churches and the trees of Brompton Cemetery. After the purchase in 2014-2016 of all of the 150-year-old residences in Empress Place and retail outlets by Lillie Bridge, scheduled for demolition, they were soft-stripped by the original developer company and are occupied as 'meanwhile use', such as very popular 'The Prince', formerly, the 'Prince of Wales' public House. The extant mid-Victorian residential and retail precinct became subject of five separate Certificates of Immunity from Listing, (COIL)s issued in May 1922 by Historic England to the present development company, which frees the buildings for re-development for a period of five years.

There are major plans to regenerate the land made vacant after the demolition of the Earls Court Exhibition Centre and adjoining property, including TFL's, historic Lillie Bridge Depot, in total 40 acres. The proposals for redevelopment were published in November 2023 and updated in March 2024 by a consortium trading as the 'Earls Court Development Company'.

The nearest significant local commercial centres are North End Road to the west, which includes a street market, Fulham Broadway to the south and Earl's Court to the north.

== Nearby places ==
- Battersea
- Chelsea
- Earl's Court
- Fulham
- Hammersmith
- South Kensington
- Stamford Bridge, Chelsea Football Club
- Wandsworth
- West Kensington
