= 237–245 New King's Road =

Houses in Fulham, London, England

Coordinates: 51.472535°N 0.200140°W

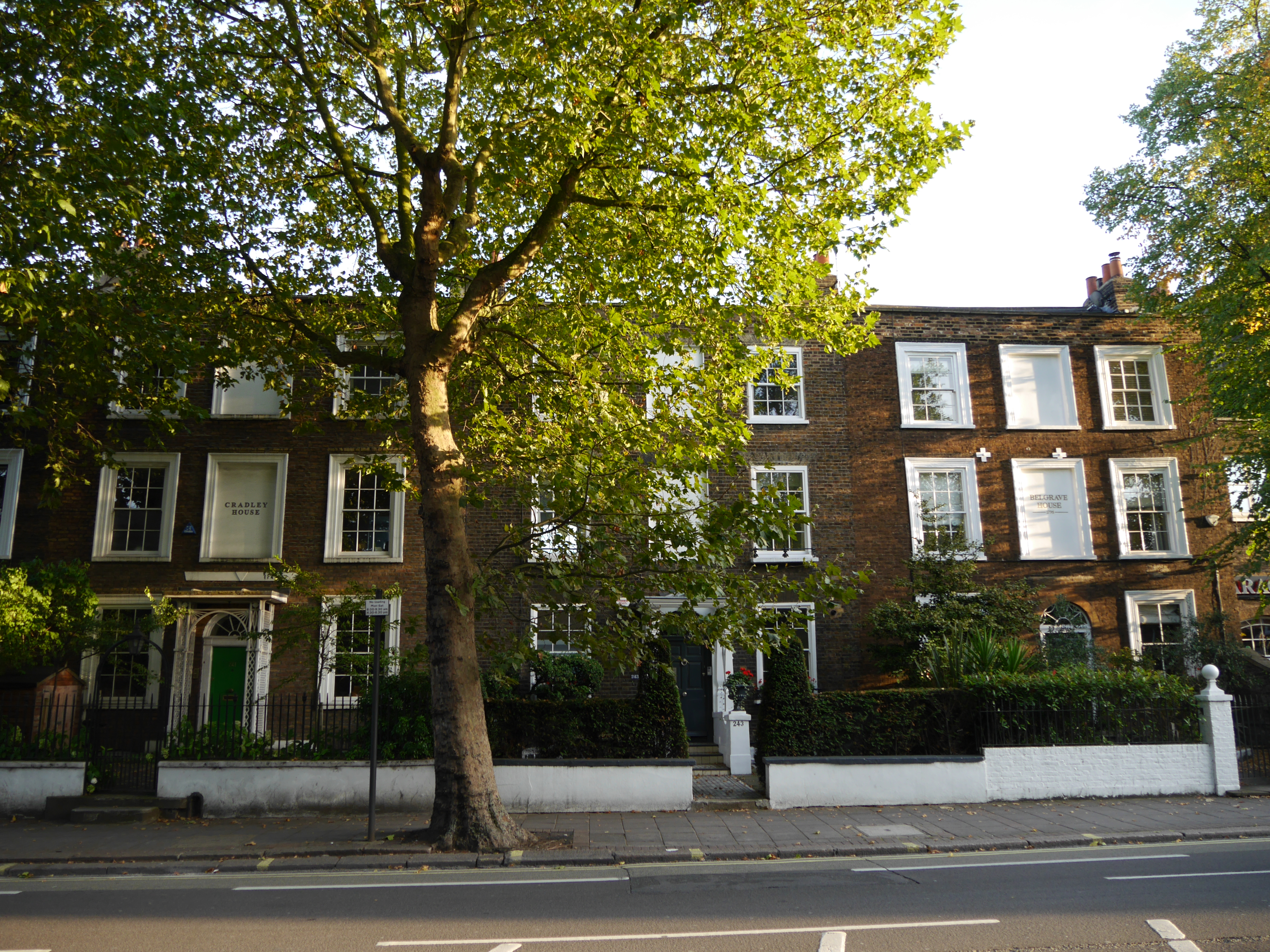
237–245 New King's Road, Fulham, London

237–245 New King's Road is a Grade II listed terrace of five houses at 237–245 New King's Road, Fulham, London, England.

The houses were built in about 1795.
